= High-frequency oscillations =

Brainwaves with frequencies larger than 80 Hz

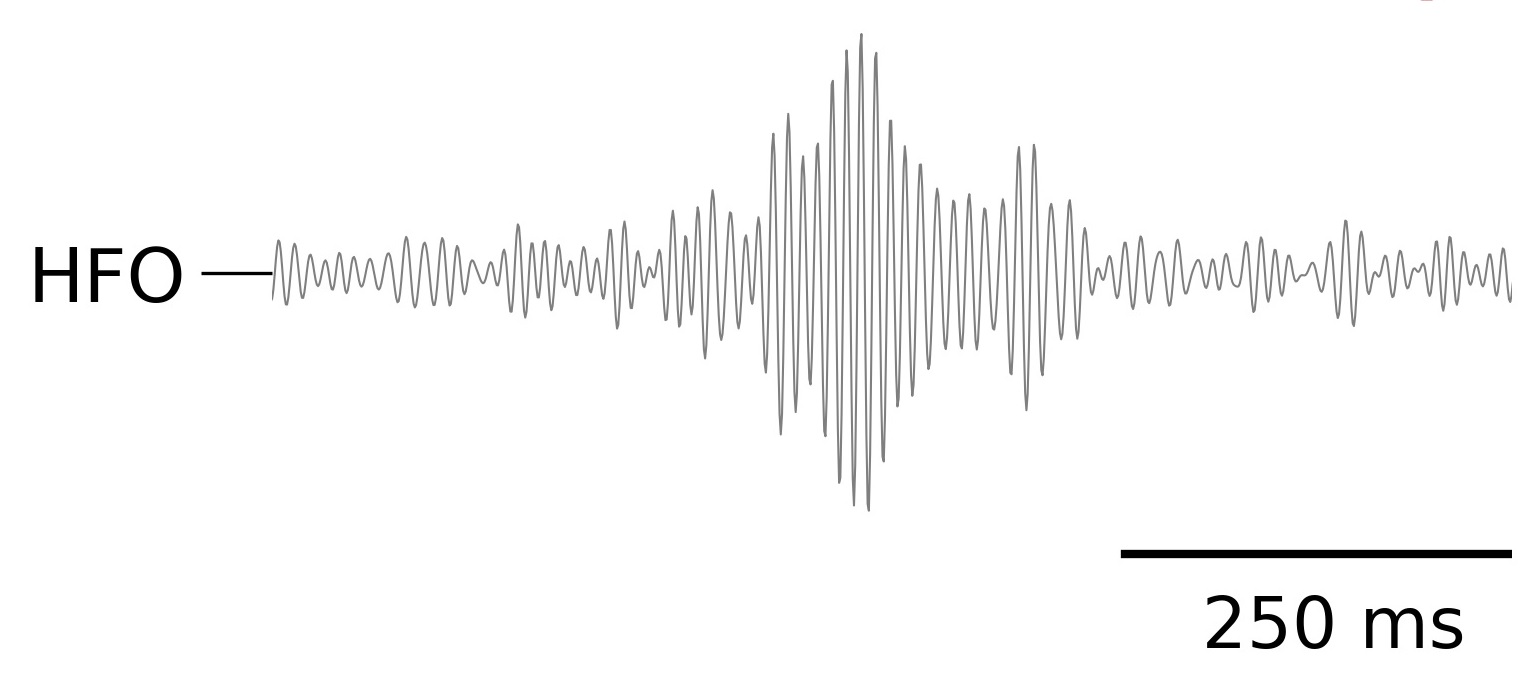
Example of the high-frequency oscillation burst recorded from the brain

High-frequency oscillations (HFO) are brain waves of the frequency faster than ~80 Hz, generated by neuronal cell population. High-frequency oscillations can be recorded during an electroencephalagram (EEG), local field potential (LFP) or electrocorticogram (ECoG) electrophysiology recordings. They are present in physiological state during sharp waves and ripples - oscillatory patterns involved in memory consolidation processes. HFOs are associated with pathophysiology of the brain like epileptic seizure and are often recorded during seizure onset. It makes a promising biomarker for the identification of the epileptogenic zone. Other studies points to the HFO role in psychiatric disorders and possible implications to psychotic episodes in schizophrenia.

== Background and history ==
Traditional classification of the frequency bands, that are associated to different functions/states of the brain and consist of delta, theta, alpha, beta and gamma bands. Due to the limited capabilities of the early experimental/medical setup to record fast frequencies, for historical reason, all oscillations above 30 Hz were considered as high frequency and were difficult to investigate. Recent advance in manufacturing electrophysiological setups enables to record electric potential with high temporal and space resolution, and to "catch" dynamics of single cell action potential. In neuroscience nomenclature, there is still a reaming gap between ~100 Hz and multi unit activity (>500 Hz), so these oscillations are often called high gamma or HFO.

== Neurophysiological features ==
HFO are generated by different cellular mechanisms and can be detected in many brain areas. In hippocampus, this fast neuronal activity is effect of the population synchronous spiking of pyramidal cells in the CA3 region and dendritic layer of the CA1, which give rise to a characteristic oscillation pattern (see more in sharp waves and ripples). The HFO occurrence during memory task (encoding and recalling images) was also reported in human patients from intracranial recordings in primary visual, limbic and higher order cortical areas. Another example of physiological HFO of around 300 Hz, was found in subthalamic nucleus, the brain region which is the main target for high-frequency (130 Hz) deep brain stimulation treatment for patients with Parkinson's disease.

=== Somatosensory evoked high-frequency oscillations ===
ECoG recordings from human somatosensory cortex, has shown HFO (reaching even 600 Hz) presence during sensory evoked potentials and somatosensory evoked magnetic field after median nerve stimulation. These bursts of activity are generated by thalamocortical loop and driven by highly synchronized spiking of the thalamocortical fibres, and are thought to play a role in information processing. Somatosensory evoked HFO amplitude changes may be potentially used as biomarker for neurologic disorders, which can help in diagnosis in certain clinical contexts. Some oncology patients with brain tumors showed higher HFOs amplitude on the same side, where the tumor was. Authors of this study also suggest contribution from the thalamocortical pathways to the fast oscillations. Interestingly, higher HFO amplitudes (between 400 and 800 Hz) after nerve stimulation were also reported in the EEG signal of healthy football and racquet sports players.

=== Pathological HFO ===
There are many studies, that reports pathophysiological types of HFO in human patients and animal models of disease, which are related to different psychiatric or neurological disorders:

- Amplitude aberrations of the sensory evoked HFOs (600 Hz) was reported in mild demyelination in multiple sclerosis patients.
- HFO (>80 Hz) occur during epileptic seizure onset.
- Disruption in the HFO (200–500 Hz) synchronization in subthalamic nucleus is related to Parkinson's disease symptoms.
- HFOs are visible in different brain regions just after cardiac-arrest and are linked to near-death states.
- High amplitude HFOs (80–200 Hz) bursts correlates with psychotic-like state evoked with PCP or subanesthetic dose of ketamine (and other NMDA receptor blockers).

=== NMDA receptor hypofunction HFO ===
Current source density reconstruction (done with kCSD method, red and blue dots) of the example HFO burst recorded (6 channel setup - green dots) from rat's brain (grey dots)

There are increasing number of studies indicating that HFO rhythms (130–180 Hz) may arise due to the local NMDA receptor blockage, which is also a pharmacological model of schizophrenia. These NMDA receptor dependent fast oscillations were detected in different brain areas including hippocampus, nucleus accumbens and prefrontal cortex regions. Despite the fact that this type of HFO was not yet confirmed in human patients, second generation antipsychotic drugs, widely used to treat schizophrenia and schizoaffective disorders (i.e. Clozapine, Risperidone), were shown to reduce HFO frequency. Recent studies, reports on the new source of HFO in the olfactory bulb structures, which is surprisingly stronger than any other previously seen in the mammalian brain. HFO in the bulb is generated by local excitatory-inhibitory circuits modulated by breathing rhythm and may be also recorded under ketamine-xylazine anesthesia. This findings may aid understanding early symptoms of schizophrenia patients and their relatives, that can suffer from olfactory system impairments.

== See also ==
=== Brain waves ===
- Delta wave – (0.1 – 3 Hz)
- Theta wave – (4 – 7 Hz)
- Mu wave – (7.5 – 12.5 Hz)
- SMR wave – (12.5 – 15.5 Hz)
- Alpha wave – (7 (or 8) – 12 Hz)
- Beta wave – (12 – 30 Hz)
- Gamma wave – (32 – 100 Hz)
