= Sharp waves and ripples =

Biological phenomenon

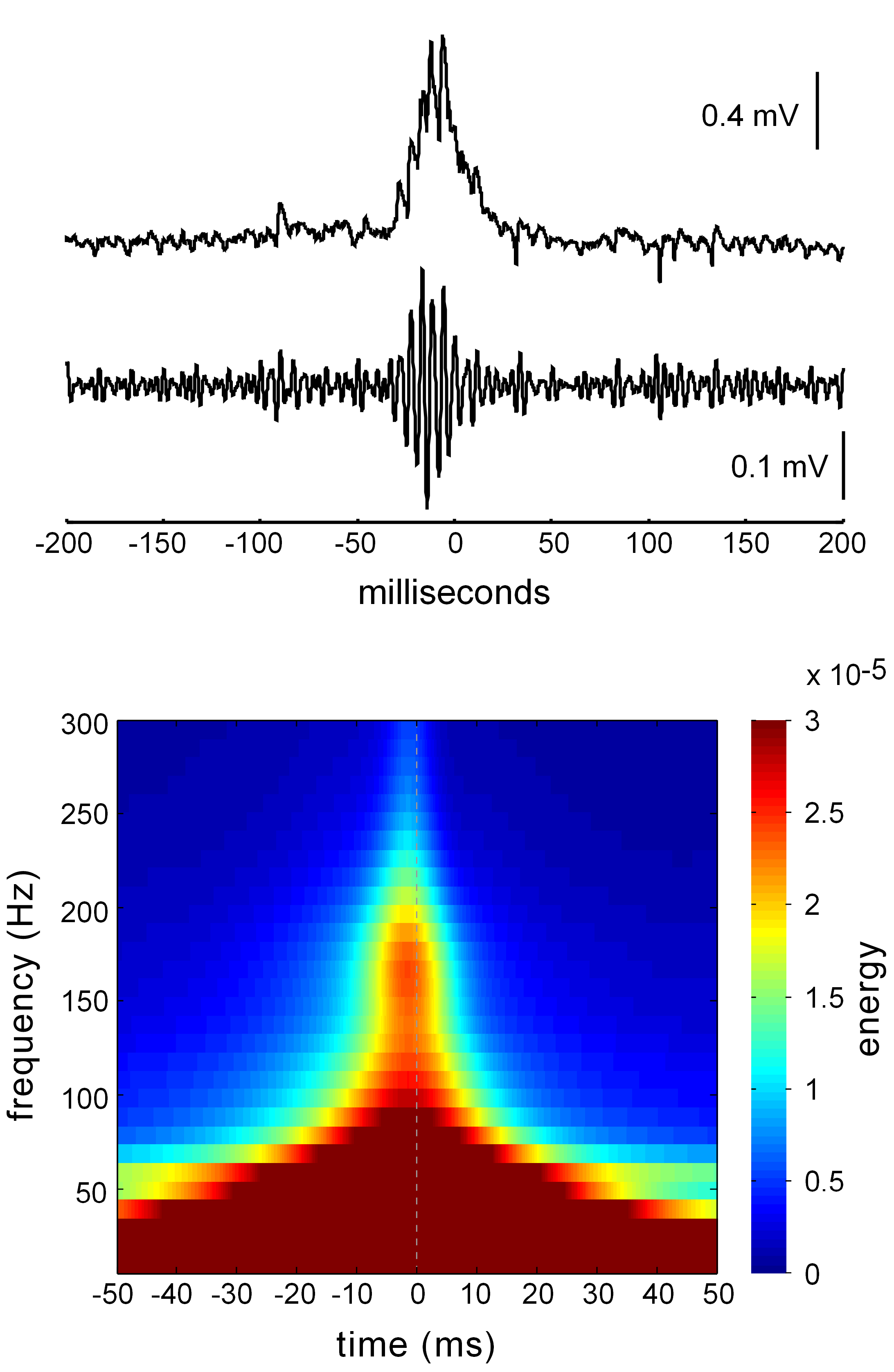
Example of a sharp wave ripple recorded in CA3, unfiltered (top) and high-pass filtered trace (middle). Time-frequency plot (bottom) shows high frequencies (150-200 Hz) in the ascending phase of the SWR.

Sharp waves and ripples (SPW-R), also called sharp wave ripples (SWR), are oscillatory patterns produced by extremely synchronized activity of neurons in the mammalian hippocampus and neighboring regions which occur spontaneously in idle waking states or during NREM sleep. They can be observed with a variety of electrophysiological methods such as field recordings or EEG. They are composed of large amplitude sharp waves in local field potential and produced by thousands of neurons firing together within a 30–100 ms window. Within this broad time window, pyramidal cells fire only at specific times set by fast spiking GABAergic interneurons. The fast rhythm of inhibition (150-200 Hz) synchronizes the firing of active pyramidal cells, each of which only fires one or two action potentials exactly between the inhibitory peaks, collectively generating the ripple pattern. SWRs have been extensively characterized by György Buzsáki and have been shown to be involved in memory consolidation in NREM sleep. Neuronal firing sequences acquired during wakefulness are replayed during SWRs.

== History and background ==
Neuronal oscillations are important components of neuroscience research. During the last two decades, hippocampal oscillations have been a major focus in the research of neuronal oscillations. Among different oscillations present in the brain, SWRs are the first population activity that start in the developing hippocampus. Originally, these large waves were observed by Cornelius Vanderwolf in 1969. John O'Keefe investigated SWRs in 1978 while studying the spatial memory of rats. György Buzsáki and his collaborators studied and characterized SWRs in further detail and described their physiological functions and role in different states of the animal.

These patterns are large amplitude, aperiodic recurrent oscillations occurring in the apical dendritic layer of the CA1 regions of the hippocampus. Sharp waves are followed by synchronous fast field oscillations (140–200 Hz frequency), named ripples. Features of these oscillations provided evidences for their role in inducing synaptic plasticity and memory consolidation. Among these features are their widespread effect on the population of neurons in the hippocampus, and the experience-related activity of participating neurons. Studies have shown that elimination of SWRs by electrical stimulation interfered with the ability of rats to recall spatial memories. These features support functional role of sharp waves and ripples in memory consolidation.

== Hippocampal formation ==
=== Structures ===
==== Circuit ====
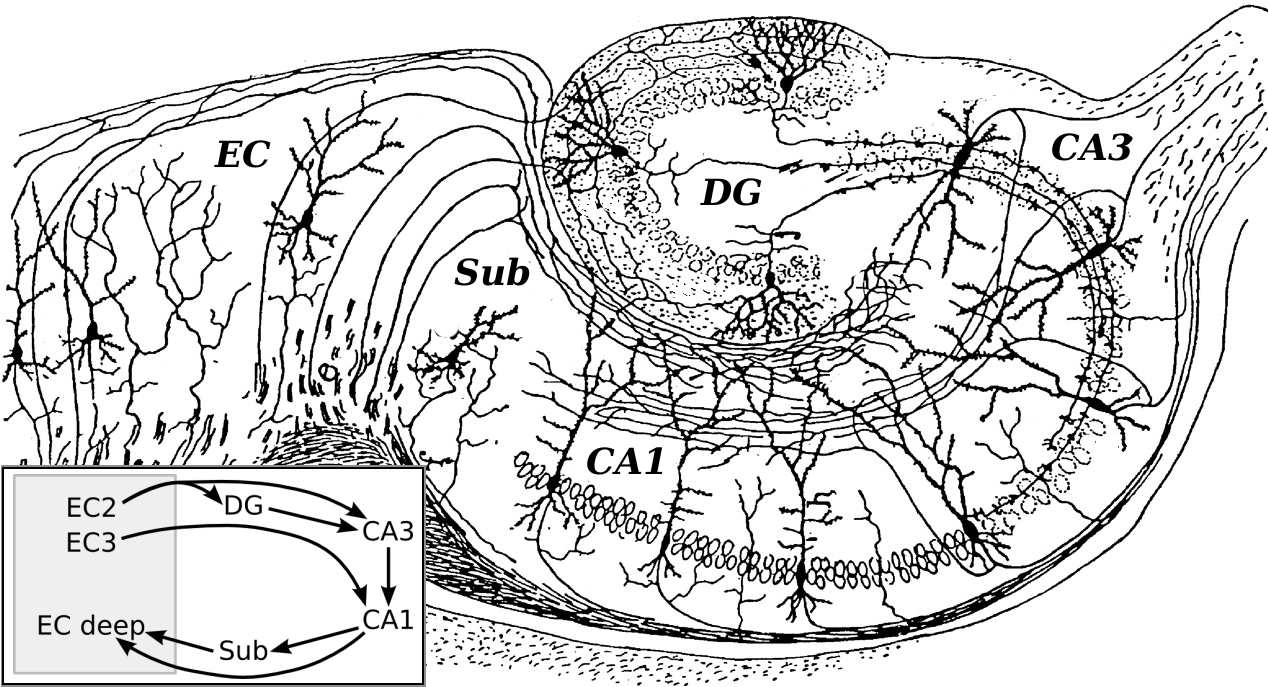
Hippocampal circuit in rodent hippocampus. Connections between CA3 and CA1 regions with parahippocampal structures is shown.

The trisynaptic loop, as the main circuit of the hippocampus responsible for information transfer between the hippocampus and the cortex, is also the circuit producing SWRs. This circuit provides the pathway by which SWRs affect the cortical areas, and also receive inputs from them. Consequently, this loop is shown to be the pathway responsible for conversion of short-term memory to long-term memory. The trisynaptic loop of the hippocampus is one of the most thoroughly studied circuits for long-term potentiation.

==== Participant neuronal populations ====
Emergence of these self-organized hippocampal events are dependent on interactions between pyramidal cells and different types of the interneurons in this circuit. Pyramidal cells of CA3 and CA1 are important in generating these waves, and they affect the subiculum, parasubiculum, entorhinal cortex, and ultimately neurons of the neocortex. During SWRs, which last approximately 100 milliseconds, 50,000–100,000 neurons discharge in synchrony, making SWRs the most synchronous event in the brain. An important concept about the neuronal populations participating in these events is the fact that they are experience-dependent. Sequences that have been active during the animal's activity are the ones participating in SWRs. Activity naturally spreads along the pathways that have stronger synapses. This is one of the features of SWRs providing evidence for their role in memory consolidation.

=== Network mechanisms of generation ===
==== Self-emergent network activity ====
Population bursts of pyramidal cells in the CA3 region of the hippocampus via CA3 collaterals cause depolarization of pyramidal cells in the dendritic layer of the CA1 which give rise to extracellular negative waves – the sharp waves – followed by fast ripples. Discharge of pyramidal cells of CA3 region also activates the GABAergic interneurons. Sparse firing of CA1 pyramidal cells and in-phase inhibition from the activated interneurons, give rise to high frequency (200 Hz) network oscillations, which are the ripples. The rhythmic activity is exported to CA1 and eventually reaches the target population of parahippocampal structures.

==== Effects of neocortical inputs ====
sleep spindle and K-complex in EEG

In spite of the self-emergent nature of the SWRs, their activity could be altered by inputs from the neocortex via the trisynaptic loop to the hippocampus. Activity of the neocortex during slow wave sleep determines inputs to the hippocampus; thalamocortical sleep spindles and delta waves are the sleep patterns of the neocortex. These inputs contribute to the selection of different neuronal assemblies for initiation of SWRs, and affect the timing of the SWRs. Different thalamocortical neuronal assemblies give rise to sleep spindles, and these cell assemblies affect the burst initiator for the sharp waves. In this manner, thalamocortical inputs affect the content of the SWRs going to neocortex.

== Memory consolidation ==
Sharp waves and associated ripples are present in the mammalian brains of the species that have been investigated for this purpose, including mice, rats, rabbits, monkeys and humans. In all of these species, they have been shown primarily to be involved in consolidation of recently acquired memories during the immobility and slow-wave sleep. Characteristics of these oscillations, such as having experience dependent neuronal content, being affected by the cortical input, and reactivating neocortical pathways formed through recent experiences, provides evidences for their role in memory consolidation. Besides, some direct evidences for their role come from studies, investigating effects of their removal. Animal studies indicated that depletion of ripple activity by electrical stimulation, would impair formation of new memories in rats. Furthermore, in spatially non-demanding tasks, such as passive exploration, optogenetic disruption of SWR events interferes with the stabilisation of the newly formed hippocampal place cell code (ref, but see ref). As for humans, what is currently suspected is that the hippocampus as a whole is important for some forms of memory consolidation such as declarative and spatial memories. However, clear evidence for the role of SWR events in memory consolidation in the hippocampus of humans is still missing.

=== Two-stage model of memory ===
Based on the research findings about SWRs, in 1989 an influential two-stage model of memory proposed by Buzsáki, that subsequent evidences supported it. Based on this model initial memories of the events are formed during the acquisition and reinforced during replay. Acquisition occurs by theta and gamma waves activating a neuronal pathway for initial formation of the memory. Later this pathway would get replayed following the SPW-Rs propagation to neocortex. Neuronal sequences during replay happen in a faster rate and are in both forward and reverse direction of the initial formation.

== Ripples and fast gamma ==
In spite of the fact that hippocampal ripples (140–220 Hz) and fast gamma (90–150 Hz) oscillations have similar mechanisms of generation, they are two distinct patterns in the hippocampus. They are both produced as the response of the CA1 region to inputs from the CA3 region. Ripples are only present when theta waves are relatively absent during sharp waves, whereas fast gamma waves occur during theta waves and sharp waves. The magnitude and frequency of both ripples and fast gamma patterns are dependent on the magnitude of hippocampal sharp waves. Stronger excitation from sharp waves results in ripple oscillations, whereas weaker stimulations generate fast gamma patterns. Besides they are shown to be region dependent, ripples that are the fastest oscillations are present in the CA1 region pyramidal cells while gamma oscillations dominate in CA3 region and parahippocampal structures.

== Disease state ==
=== Epilepsy ===
In addition to ongoing research on the role of SWR complexes in memory consolidation and neuronal plasticity, another major area of the attention is their role in development of epilepsy. One of the deviations from normal activity is fast ripples. Fast ripples are a pathologic pattern that emerges from the physiologic ripples. These fast ripples are field potentials of hypersynchronous bursting of excitatory neurons pyramidal cells at frequencies between 250 and 600 Hz. Fast ripples in the hippocampus are considered as pathologic patterns directly associated with epilepsy, but they appear during both physiological and pathological states in neocortex. Although the underlying physiology and identifying contributions of fast ripples in generation of seizures are still under investigation, some studies suggest that fast ripples could be used as a biomarker of epileptogenic tissues.

== See also ==
- Hippocampus
- Neural oscillation
- Epilepsy
- Sleep spindle

=== Other brain waves ===
- Delta wave – (0.1–4 Hz)
- Alpha wave – (8–12 Hz)
- Theta wave – (4–8 Hz)
- Mu wave – (8–13 Hz)
- Beta wave – (13–30 Hz)
- Gamma wave – (25–100 Hz)
- High-frequency oscillations – (>80 Hz)
