= Large irregular activity =

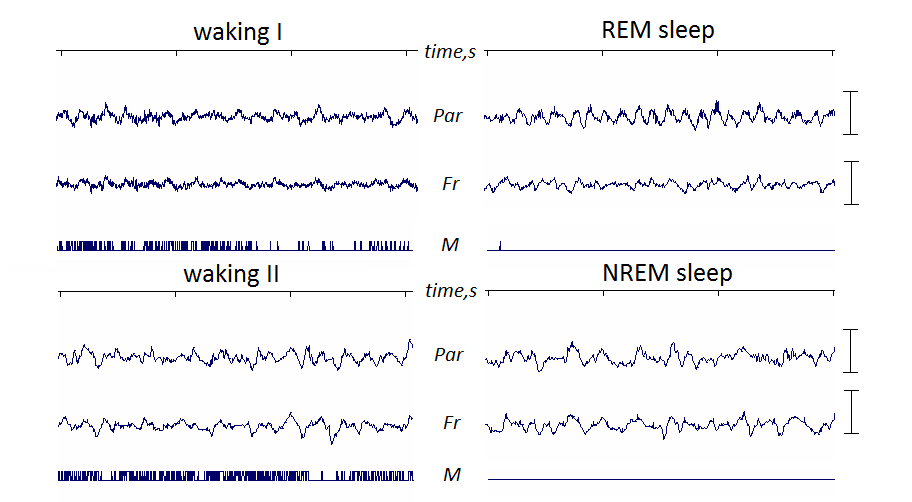
LIA in a mouse EEG

Large (amplitude) irregular activity (LIA), refers to one of two local field states that have been observed in the hippocampus. The other field state is that of the theta rhythm. The theta state is characterised by a steady slow oscillation of around 6–7 Hz. LIA has a predominantly lower oscillation frequency but contains some sharp spikes, called sharp waves of a higher frequency than that of theta. LIA accompanies the small irregular activity state to which the term LIA has been used to describe overall (termed by Vanderwolf, 1969).

EEG signals picked up in the human (or any large mammalian) cerebral cortex are quite small and diffuse and from the deeper smaller hippocampus they are much more difficult to register. This has meant the study of hippocampal activity has been largely restricted to that of the rat and less often the mouse.

Theta rhythm with its low frequency of around 6–7 Hz in a steady oscillation has been observed in rats that are motionless but alert. This extends to that sleeping cycle characterised by rapid eye movement (REM). When eating, grooming, drowsy, or sleeping in slow-wave sleep (SWS), there has been observed in hippocampal EEG, the non-rhythmic pattern of large irregular activity,(LIA). LIA has the predominant pattern of large amplitude slow waves that contain some fluctuations of sharp spikes (sharp waves) of 50–100 ms duration. The predominant frequency of LIA is slower than that of theta waves. LIA is often accompanied by ripples in the pyramidal cell layer.

When the neural circuitry of the hippocampus is activated it tends to oscillate at theta frequencies. It has also been noted that a fair proportion of hippocampal neurons fire in a correlation with sharp wave activity.

The theta state is thought to be involved in the process of learning, and retrieval, and LIA is thought to be involved in the consolidation of older memories. However the mechanism of these two field oscillations remains unknown.

It has been suggested that the theta state is inactive during the presence of LIA and think that theta ordinarily provides an inhibitory process which locks most of the pyramidal cells so that only a few can fire at any time. When LIA is present large numbers of pyramidal cells are activated. There is always a delay of a few seconds between the onset of behaviour related to LIA, such as resting and the subsequent sharp wave and ripples, suggesting the release from active inhibition.

== See also ==
- Delta wave
