= I-BrainTech =

Israeli technology company

i-BrainTech LTD.
- Company type: Private
- Industry: Neurofeedback
- Founded: 2019
- Headquarters: Tel Aviv, Israel
- Number of locations: 2
- Area served: Worldwide
- Key people: Konstantin Sonkin (CEO); Yoav Zamir (CTO); Yoel Feldman (Business Development)
- Number of employees: 15
- Website: www.i-brain.tech

i-BrainTech is a software company specializing in the provision of brain–computer interfaces for motor control neurofeedback therapy. The company is headquartered in Tel Aviv, Israel.

== History ==
i-BrainTech was founded in 2019 by entrepreneur and computer scientist Dr. Konstantin Sonkin. Prior to the company's creation, Sonkin worked in the centre for innovation at The Sagol School of Neuroscience, Tel Aviv University. While working on applications of neuroscience using artificial intelligence Sonkin met neuroscientist Yoav Zamir and entrepreneur Yoel Feldman.

In 2020, i-Braintech was one of 10 Israeli startups selected to participate in Techstars Tel Aviv. Following this participation, i-BrainTech secured a $1.5M seed funding round led by the venture capital fund Orbita Capital.

== Products ==
i-Braintech's initial neurofeedback product is a soccer themed video game that is controlled by a user's thoughts only. Athletes that have used this game and spoken publicly about its subjective utility include prior captain of the USA national team and current midfielder of Chicago Fire F.C., Jonathan Bornstein.
