= Encephalography =

Encephalography may refer to:

- Electroencephalography
- Hemoencephalography
- Magnetoencephalography
- Pneumoencephalography
