= Hemoencephalography =

Neurofeedback technique

Hemoencephalography (HEG) is a neurofeedback technique in the field of neurotherapy. Neurofeedback, a specific form of biofeedback, is based on the idea that human beings can consciously alter their brain function through training sessions in which they attempt to change the signal generated by their brain and measured via a neurological feedback mechanism. On completion of the process, participants increase cerebral blood flow to a specified region of the brain, consequently increasing brain activity and performance on tasks involving the specific region of the brain.

== Overview ==
Both approaches to hemoencephalography, near infrared and passive infrared, are indirect measures of neural activity based on neurovascular coupling. Neurovascular coupling is the mechanism by which cerebral blood flow is matched to metabolic activity. When a region of the cortex is used in a specific cognitive task, neuronal activity in that region increases, consequently increasing local metabolic rate. To keep up with the nutritional and waste removal demands of a higher metabolic rate, cerebral blood flow to the cortical area in use must increase proportionally. Along with the increase in flow, hemoglobin molecules in the blood, which are responsible for the transport and transference of oxygen to tissue throughout the body, must increase the amount of oxygen they deliver to the activated region of the cortex, resulting in a greater local blood oxygenation level. This is also referred to as the haemodynamic response.

=== Near infrared (NIR) ===
Developed by Hershel Toomim, near infrared hemoencephalography measures changes in the local oxygenation level of the blood. Similar to functional magnetic resonance imaging, which uses changes in the magnetic properties of blood resulting from oxygenation to form an image of brain activity, NIR utilizes the changes in blood translucence resulting from oxygenation to generate a signal that can be consciously manipulated in neurofeedback sessions. At the most basic level, NIR hemoencephalography shines alternating red (660 nm) and near infra-red (850 nm) light on a specified area of the brain, usually through the forehead. While the skull is largely translucent to these wavelengths of light, blood is not. The red light is used as a probe, while the infrared light provides a relatively stable baseline for comparison. Photoelectric cells in a spectrophotometer device worn on the forehead measure the amount of each wavelength of light reflected by cerebral blood flow in the activated cortical tissue and send the data to a computer, which then calculates the ratio of red to infrared light and translates it into a visual signal corresponding to oxygenation level on a graphical interface the patient can see. The key nutrient monitored by NIR is oxygen. In NIR, as the ratio of oxygenated hemoglobin (HbO2) to deoxygenated hemoglobin (Hb) increases, the blood becomes less and less translucent and scatters more of the red light, instead of absorbing it. In contrast, the amount of infrared light scattered by the blood is largely impermeable to changes in the oxygenation level of hemoglobin.

=== Passive infrared (PIR) ===
Developed by Jeffrey Carmen, a privately practicing psychologist in New York, passive infrared HEG is a marriage of the classic hemoencephalography principles employed by Toomim and a technique known as thermoscopy. PIR uses a sensor similar to the NIR sensor to detect light from a narrow band of the infrared spectrum that corresponds to the amount of heat being generated by an active brain region, as well as the local blood oxygenation level. The heat detected by PIR is proportional to the amount of sugar being burned to maintain the increased metabolic rate necessary to fuel elevated neuronal activity. PIR has a poorer resolution than NIR and this treatment typically focuses on more global increases in cerebral blood flow.

== History ==
The first true instance of neurofeedback occurred in 1963, when University of Chicago professor Joseph Kamiya trained a volunteer to recognize and alter alpha brain wave activity. Just five years later, Barry Sterman conducted a revolutionary study on cats at the behest of NASA that proved that cats trained to consciously alter their sensorimotor rhythm were resistant to doses of hydrazine that typically induce seizures. This finding was applied to humans in 1971 when Sterman trained an epileptic to control her seizures through a combination of sensorimotor rhythm and EEG neurotherapy to the extent that she obtained a driver's license after only three months of treatment. Around the same time Hershel Toomim was founding Toomim Biofeedback Laboratories and Biocomp Research Institute on the basis of a device known as the Alpha Pacer that measured brain waves. After decades of work with various biofeedback mechanisms, Toomim accidentally stumbled upon conscious control of cerebral blood flow in 1994. He developed a device specific to this measure that he called a Near Infrared Spectrophotometry Hemencephalography system, coining the term "hemoencephalography", in 1997. A clinician user of NIR HEG, Jeffrey Carmen, adapted Toomim's system for migraines in 2002 by integrating peripheral thermal biofeedback into the design. Since then, both techniques have been applied to numerous disorders of frontal and prefrontal lobe function. Sherrill, R. (2004).

== Training ==
Prior to training with the HEG device, patients are given a standardized pre test, most often the Test of Variables of Attention (TOVA), to assess baseline cognitive functioning. Patient progress will be tracked using the same measure at the beginning and end of every neurotherapy session. Single photon emission computed tomography (SPECT) assessments may also be conducted pre and post treatment, depending on the patient's disorder. Training sessions are typically 45 minutes to an hour in length, with intermittent breaks. At the outset, all sessions are performed at a certified neurotherapy provider's clinic (though some at-home options are now available) and begin 2-3 times weekly in frequency. Depending on the patient, training may last from a couple of months to a couple of years. High variability in red light activity (large range from low to high output) is typically characteristic of people with problems of the prefrontal cortex. Low variability is associated with more normal functioning. The ratio of red/infrared light refraction is displayed as a visual signal on a computer monitor and may also be translated into an auditory signal in which higher pitch corresponds to greater oxygenation. During a HEG training session patients attempt to increase the signal generated by the HEG sensor. Progress is measured by reduced variability.

== Advantages ==
Currently, the most popular neurotherapy techniques utilize electroencephalography (EEG), which measures electrical brain activity rather than blood flow. Proponents of hemoencephalography maintain that HEG has advantages over EEG, namely:

- Signal that is more straightforward and stable than EEG and thus easier to interpret and quicker to train with
- Less subject to external artifacts, such as electrical noise or signal interference due to metal, because HEG is a measure of blood flow and not electrical activity
- Less subject to surface artifacts, such as eye and facial movements
- Capable of at-home training due to smaller, more portable size of sensor and signal generation equipment

== Disadvantages ==
The main practical limitations of HEG as compared to EEG are:

- Due to interference from hair, only the forehead or bald regions of the scalp can be trained using current technology, whereas EEG measurements can be obtained from anywhere on the scalp.
- Only one site at a time can be trained using current technology, whereas EEG can be applied on anywhere from 1 to as many as 19 sites at once using current technology.

Other disadvantages of HEG mirror current frustrations with fMRI and stem from the indirect nature of both techniques and reliance on individual patterns of cerebral blood flow:

- Cannot be used as between-subjects comparison due to the wide variations in blood flow and skull thickness from one person to the next
- Cannot be used as a temporal measure because changes in blood oxygenation level are not instantaneous
- Mechanistic claims are unsupported as no reverse causal relationship between blood-flow increase and neuronal activity has been found yet

== Promising research ==
Most research in HEG has focused on disorders of the prefrontal cortex (PFC), the cortical region directly behind the forehead that controls high level executive functions such as planning, judgment, emotional regulation, inhibition, organization, and cause and effect determination. The prefrontal cortex is thought essential for all goal-directed and socially-mediated behavior. The PFC is an ideal target for HEG due to both its location on the scalp (behind the forehead, where there is no hair to disrupt the scattering of the red and infrared light) and the susceptibility of its primary functions to learning.

=== Migraines ===
Research with PIR has focused almost exclusively on alleviating tension headaches and migraines. A four-year study of 100 chronic migraine sufferers found that after as few as six 30-minute training sessions, 90% of patients reported significant improvements with their migraines. Another study conducted combined the biofeedback measures of EEG, hemoencephalography and thermal handwarming during thrice weekly sessions for 14 months. 70% of sufferers saw a 50% or more reduction in their migraines following combined neurotherapy and drug treatment, as opposed to 50% undergoing only traditional drug therapy.

=== Autism ===
The term autism encompasses a wide range of syndromes, such as Rett disorder, pervasive developmental disorder (PDD) and Asperger's syndrome, that are collectively referred to as autism spectrum disorders (ASD). All ASD sufferers exhibit impaired understanding and performance of social and communicative skills, impulsivity, difficulties with attention and some mode of obsessive behavior. Many patients with ASD have normal to above normal intelligence, but exhibit wildly abnormal EEG readings, which combined with symptoms synonymous with impaired executive control make them prime candidates for pre-frontal centric neurotherapy. The myriad of studies exploring the potency of neurotherapy as a treatment for ASD have primarily involved EEG and QEEG, but one recent study investigated the efficacy of both NIR and PIR training against a QEEG only control group and found that, according to parental reports, those in both HEG groups experienced a more than 50% decrease in symptoms. These reports were supported by decreased EEG variability and improvements on measures of neurobiological and neuropsychological functioning. NIR was found to have a greater impact on attention, while PIR had greater efficacy in the realms of emotional regulation and social interactions.

=== Attention deficit hyperactivity disorder ===
With many symptoms reminiscent of ASD, Attention Deficit Hyperactivity Disorder (ADHD) has also been a focus of HEG research. In one case study, an adolescent with ADHD presented with highly abnormal QEEG readings and attentional scores on neuropsychological tests. After only ten biweekly HEG training sessions, he rendered a completely normal QEEG reading and significantly improved scores on attentional measures. Notable about this research is that the improvements persisted eighteen months post-treatment, allowing the patient to greatly reduce the drug therapy necessary for him to function successfully in school and offering a quick and relatively cheap treatment alternative for school systems and parents of children with ADD/ADHD.

=== Cognitive performance ===
A large group of researchers headed up by Dr. Hershel Toomim and his wife Marjorie have repeatedly found that NIR HEG training can consciously enhance regional cerebral oxygenation to specific areas of the brain and result in increased performance on cognitive tasks. It is widely known that regular cardiovascular exercise results in increased cerebral blood flow due to increased vascularization of the capillaries feeding neuronal tissue. Toomim, Mize, Kwong et al. found that after only ten 30-minute sessions of HEG brain exercise training, participants with various neurological disorders showed increases in attention and decreases in impulsivity to within normal levels. A subset of participants also experienced increases in cerebral vascularization similar to those witnessed upon increasing physical activity. More importantly, degree of improvement was found to be reliably related to the initial TOVA score of each participant, with the lowest initial TOVA scores exhibiting the greatest improvement.

== Others ==
In addition, HEG has shown promise at alleviating depression, stress and chronic anxiety. There is also work done by Luis Gaviria at Las Americas Hospital, where neurosurgery patients were given 20 minutes HEG sessions, as part of their rehabilitation process. These patients showed improvement in reconnecting with their loved ones, compared to their control counterparts.
