= Alpha wave =

Neural oscillations in the frequency range of 8–12 Hz

Alpha waves

Alpha waves, or the alpha rhythm, are neural oscillations in the frequency range of 8–12 Hz likely originating from the synchronous and coherent (in phase or constructive) neocortical neuronal electrical activity possibly involving thalamic pacemaker cells. Historically, they are also called "Berger's waves" after Hans Berger, who first described them when he invented the EEG in 1924.

Alpha waves are one type of brain waves detected by electrophysiological methods, e.g., electroencephalography (EEG) or magnetoencephalography (MEG), and can be quantified using power spectra and time-frequency representations of power like quantitative electroencephalography (qEEG). They are predominantly recorded over parieto-occipital brain and were the earliest brain rhythm recorded in humans. Alpha waves can be observed during relaxed wakefulness, especially when there is no mental activity. During the eyes-closed condition, alpha waves are prominent at parietal locations. Attentional processing or cognitive tasks attenuate (reduce) the alpha waves.

Historically, alpha waves were thought to represent the brain in an idle state as they are strongest during rest and quiet wakefulness. More recently it was found the alpha oscillations increase in demanding task not requiring visual input. In particular, alpha oscillations increase during maintenance (retention) of visually presented information. These findings resulted in the notion that alpha oscillations inhibit areas of the cortex not in use, and they play an active role in network coordination and communication. Whether they are inhibitory or play an active role in attention may link to their direction of propagation. Possibly top-down propagating waves are inhibitory whereas forward propagating waves reflect visual bottom-up attentional processes, but this is still an area of active research.

== Research ==
=== Origins ===
Human alpha rhythm has strong generators in parieto-occipital areas which can be coherent with sources in the pulvinar and lateral geniculate nucleus. They are generated in other neocortical areas as well. Oscillations in the alpha band called a mu wave can be found over the primary motor cortex. At multi-electrode study performed in non-human primates reported alpha oscillations widespread across neocortex.

One study reported that cortical alpha leads pulvinar (thalamic) alpha, challenging prevailing theories of a thalamic pacemaker. Based on intracranial recordings in epileptic patients it was reported that alpha acts within the nervous system by propagating from cortex to thalamus. It remains to be determined if these findings generalize to healthy participants.

The experimental and computational models explored by Traub RD et al. suggested cortical- a lamina- and principal neuron subtype specific origin for the visual alpha rhythm.

=== Development ===
On the basis of examination of patients with congenital visual defects, it was established that the existence of an efficient and complete visual pathway is necessary for the development of normal EEG activity pattern. This wave begins appearing at around four months, and is initially a frequency of 4 waves per second. The mature alpha wave, at 10 waves per second, is firmly established by age 3. Other research finds an increase in alpha frequency from about 9 Hz at the age of five to about 12 Hz in 21 year olds. This shift has been linked to changes in the optic radiation and correlates with improvement in visual perception. Alpha waves can slow after neural compromise such that which occurs in hepatic encephalopathy.

=== Sleep and possible types ===
Some researchers posit that there are at least two forms of alpha waves, which may have different functions in the wake-sleep cycle.

Alpha waves are present at different stages of the wake-sleep cycle. The most widely researched is during the relaxed mental state, where the subject is at rest with eyes closed, but is not tired or asleep. This alpha activity is centered in the occipital lobe, although there has been speculation that it has a thalamic origin.

The second occurrence of alpha wave activity is during REM sleep. As opposed to the awake form of alpha activity, this form is located in a frontal-central location in the brain. The purpose of alpha activity during REM sleep has yet to be fully understood. Currently, there are arguments that alpha patterns are a normal part of REM sleep, and for the notion that it indicates a semi-arousal period. It has been suggested that this alpha activity is inversely related to REM sleep pressure.

It has long been believed that alpha waves indicate a wakeful period during sleep. This has been attributed to studies where subjects report non-refreshing sleep and have EEG records reporting high levels of alpha intrusion into sleep. This occurrence is known as alpha wave intrusion. However, it is possible that these explanations may be misleading, as they only focus on alpha waves being generated from the occipital lobe.

=== Meditation ===
Mindfulness meditation has been shown to increase alpha wave power in both healthy subjects and patients. Practitioners of Transcendental Meditation have demonstrated a one-Hertz reduction in alpha wave frequency relative to controls.

=== Alpha wave intrusion ===
Alpha wave intrusion occurs when the alpha waves appear with non-REM sleep when delta activity is expected. It is hypothesized to be associated with fibromyalgia with increased phasic alpha sleep activity correlated with clinical manifestations of fibromyalgia, such as longer pain duration.

Despite this, alpha wave intrusion has not been significantly linked to any major sleep disorder, including chronic fatigue syndrome, and major depression. However, it is common in chronic fatigued patients, and may amplify the effects of other sleep disorders.

=== Mistake prediction ===
Following this lapse-of-attention line of thought, a recent study indicates that alpha waves may be used to predict mistakes. In it, MEGs measured increases of up to 25% in alpha brain wave activity before mistakes occurred. This study used common sense: alpha waves indicate idleness, and mistakes are often made when a person is doing something automatically, or "on auto-pilot", and not paying attention to the task they are performing. After the mistake was noticed by the subject, there was a decrease in alpha waves as the subject began paying more attention. This study hopes to promote the use of wireless EEG technology on employees in high-risk fields, such as air traffic controlling, to monitor alpha wave activity and gauge the attention level of the employee.

=== Processing of visual information in memory ===
A study has shown that the appearance of an alpha rhythm with open eyes can be a predictor of visual information processing in working memory. It was shown that the moment of appearance of alpha activity depends on the type of stimulus in memory and the number of visual characteristics (color, shape, etc.) that it needs to keep in memory. The authors suggest that the appearance of the alpha rhythm with open eyes may indicate a temporary shutdown of visual information processing in the primary visual cortex at the moments when the subject analyzes the image in visual memory. At these moments, information is processed in the association areas of the visual cortex (hV4, V3v, VO1, VO2 areas).

=== Visual learning ===
One study suggests that a "visual flicker paradigm to entrain individuals at their own brain rhythm (i.e. peak alpha frequency)" can result in substantially faster perceptual visual learning, maintained the day following training.

In particular, the entrainment substantially accelerated learning in a discrimination task to detect targets embedded in background clutter or to identify radial vs. concentric Glass patterns embedded in noise compared to entrainment that does not match an individual's alpha frequency.

== History ==
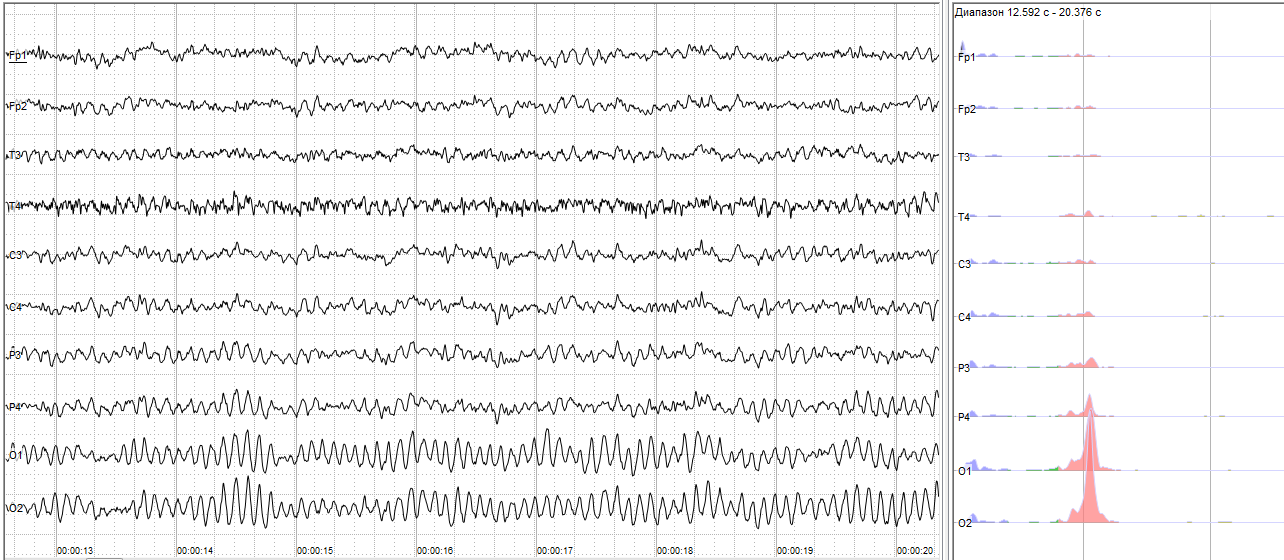
The sample of human EEG with prominent alpha-rhythm in occipital sites

Alpha waves were discovered by German neurologist Hans Berger, the inventor of the EEG itself. Alpha waves were among the first waves documented by Berger, along with beta waves, and he displayed an interest in "alpha blockage", the process by which alpha waves decrease and beta waves increase upon a subject opening their eyes. This distinction earned the alpha wave the alternate title of "Berger's Wave".

Berger took a cue from Ukrainian physiologist Vladimir Pravdich-Neminsky, who used a string galvanometer to create a photograph of the electrical activity of a dog's brain. Using similar techniques, Berger confirmed the existence of electrical activity in the human brain. He first did this by presenting a stimulus to hospital patients with skull damage and measuring the electrical activity in their brains. Later he ceased the stimulus method and began measuring the natural rhythmic electrical cycles in the brain. The first natural rhythm he documented was what would become known as the alpha wave. Five years later in 1929, he published his first findings on alpha waves in the journal Archiv für Psychiatrie. He was originally met with derision for his EEG technique and his subsequent alpha and beta wave discoveries. His technique and findings did not gain widespread acceptance in the psychological community until 1937, when he gained the approval of the famous physiologist Lord Adrian, who took a particular interest in alpha waves.

Alpha waves again gained recognition in the early 1960s and 1970s with the creation of a biofeedback theory relating to brain waves (see below). Such biofeedback, referred to as a kind of neurofeedback, relating to alpha waves is the conscious elicitation of alpha brainwaves by a subject. Two researchers in the United States explored this concept through unrelated experiments. Joe Kamiya, of the University of Chicago, discovered that some individuals had the conscious ability to recognize when they were creating alpha waves, and could increase their alpha activity. These individuals were motivated through a reward system from Kamiya. The second progenitor of biofeedback is Barry Sterman, from the University of California, Los Angeles. He was working with monitoring brain waves in cats and found that, when the cats were trained to withhold motor movement, they released SMR, or mu, waves, a wave similar to alpha waves. Using a reward system, he further trained these cats to enter this state more easily. Later, he was approached by the United States Air Force to test the effects of a jet fuel that was known to cause seizures in humans. Sterman tested the effects of this fuel on the previously-trained cats, and discovered that they had a higher resistance to seizures than non-trained cats.

Alpha wave biofeedback has gained interest for having some successes in humans for seizure suppression and for treatment of depression.

Alpha waves again gained interest in regards to an engineering approach to the science fiction challenge of psychokinesis, i.e. control of movement of a physical object using energy emanating from a human brain. In 1988, EEG alpha rhythm was used in a brain–computer interface experiment of control of a movement of a physical object, a robot. It was the first experiment to demonstrate control of a physical object, a robot, using EEG.

== See also ==
- Binaural beats – Interference pattern between signals of similar frequency
- EEGLAB
- Neural oscillation – Brainwaves, repetitive patterns of neural activity in the central nervous system
- Neurophysiological Biomarker Toolbox – MATLAB toolbox for neurophysiological biomarkers
- PGO waves – Waves propagating between brain regions

=== Brain waves ===
- Delta wave – (0.5 – 3 Hz)
- Theta wave – (4 – 7 Hz)
- Alpha wave – (8 – 12 Hz)
- Mu wave – (7.5 – 12.5 Hz)
- SMR wave – (12.5 – 15.5 Hz)
- Beta wave – (15 – 30 Hz)
- Gamma wave – (>30 Hz)
