= Mu wave =

Electrical activity in the part of the brain controlling voluntary movement

One second sample of an EEG alpha oscillations . This rhythm occurs at frequencies similar to the mu rhythm, although alpha oscillations are detected over a different part of the brain.

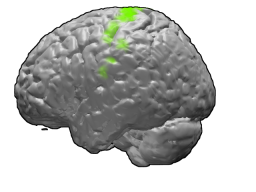
The left motor cortex, or BA4, is highlighted in green on this left lateral view of the brain. This is the area over which mu rhythms are detected bilaterally.

The sensorimotor mu rhythm, also known as mu wave, comb or wicket rhythms or arciform rhythms, are synchronized patterns of electrical activity involving large numbers of neurons, probably of the pyramidal type, in the part of the brain that controls voluntary movement. These patterns as measured by electroencephalography (EEG), magnetoencephalography (MEG), or electrocorticography (ECoG), repeat at a frequency of 7.5–12.5 (and primarily 9–11) Hz, and are most prominent when the body is physically at rest. Unlike the alpha wave, which occurs at a similar frequency over the resting visual cortex at the back of the scalp, the mu rhythm is found over the motor cortex, in a band approximately from ear to ear. People suppress mu rhythms when they perform motor actions or, with practice, when they visualize performing motor actions. This suppression is called desynchronization of the wave because EEG wave forms are caused by large numbers of neurons firing in synchrony. The mu rhythm is even suppressed when one observes another person performing a motor action or an abstract motion with biological characteristics. Researchers such as V. S. Ramachandran and colleagues have suggested that this is a sign that the mirror neuron system is involved in mu rhythm suppression, although others disagree.

The mu rhythm is of interest to a variety of scholars. Scientists who study neural development are interested in the details of the development of the mu rhythm in infancy and childhood and its role in learning. Since a group of researchers believe that autism spectrum disorder (ASD) is strongly influenced by an altered mirror neuron system and that mu rhythm suppression is a downstream indication of mirror neuron activity, many of these scientists have kindled a more popular interest in investigating the mu wave in people with ASD. Assorted investigators are also in the process of using mu rhythms to develop a new technology: the brain–computer interface (BCI). With the emergence of BCI systems, clinicians hope to give the severely physically disabled population new methods of communication and a means to manipulate and navigate their environments.

== Mirror neurons ==
The mirror neuron system consists of a class of neurons that was first studied in the 1990s in macaque monkeys. Studies have found sets of neurons that fire when these monkeys perform simple tasks and also when the monkeys view others performing the same simple tasks. This suggests they play a role in mapping others' movements into the brain without actually physically performing the movements. These sets of neurons are called mirror neurons and together make up the mirror neuron system. Mu waves are suppressed when these neurons fire, a phenomenon which allows researchers to study mirror neuron activity in humans. There is evidence that mirror neurons exist in humans as well as in non-human animals. The right fusiform gyrus, left inferior parietal lobule, right anterior parietal cortex, and left inferior frontal gyrus are of particular interest. Some researchers believe that mu wave suppression can be a consequence of mirror neuron activity throughout the brain, and represents a higher-level integrative processing of mirror neuron activity. Tests in both monkeys (using invasive measuring techniques) and humans (using EEG and fMRI) have found that these mirror neurons not only fire during basic motor tasks, but also have components that deal with intention. There is evidence of an important role for mirror neurons in humans, and mu waves may represent a high level coordination of those mirror neurons.

== Development ==
A fruitful conceptualization of mu waves in pediatric use is that mu wave suppression is a representation of activity going on in the world, and is detectable in the frontal and parietal networks. A resting oscillation becomes suppressed during the observation of sensory information such as sounds or sights, usually within the frontoparietal (motor) cortical region. The mu wave is detectable during infancy as early as four to six months, when the peak frequency the wave reaches can be as low as 5.4 Hz. There is a rapid increase in peak frequency in the first year of life, and by age two frequency typically reaches 7.5 Hz. The peak frequency of the mu wave increases with age until maturation into adulthood, when it reaches its final and stable frequency of 8–13 Hz. These varying frequencies are measured as activity around the central sulcus, within the Rolandic cortex.

Mu waves are thought to be indicative of an infant's developing ability to imitate. This is important because the ability to imitate plays a vital role in the development of motor skills, tool use, and understanding causal information through social interaction. Mimicking is integral in the development of social skills and understanding nonverbal cues. Causal relationships can be made through social learning without requiring experience firsthand. In action execution, mu waves are present in both infants and adults before and after the execution of a motor task and its accompanying desynchronization. While executing a goal-oriented action, however, infants exhibit a higher degree of desynchronization than do adults. Just as with an action execution, during action observation infants' mu waves not only show a desynchronization, but show a desynchronization greater in degree than the one evidenced in adults. This tendency for changes in degree of desynchronization, rather than actual changes in frequency, becomes the measure for mu wave development throughout adulthood, although the most changes take place during the first year of life. Understanding the mechanisms that are shared between action perception and execution in the earliest years of life has implications for language development. Learning and understanding through social interaction comes from imitating movements as well as vowel sounds. Sharing the experience of attending to an object or event with another person can be a powerful force in the development of language.

=== Autism ===
Autism is a disorder that is associated with social and communicative deficits. A single cause of autism has not been identified, but the mu wave and mirror neuron system have been studied specifically for their role in the disorder. In a typically developing individual, the mirror neuron system responds when they either watch someone perform a task or perform the task themself. In individuals with autism, mirror neurons become active (and consequently mu waves are suppressed) only when the individual performs the task themself. This finding has led some scientists, notably V. S. Ramachandran and colleagues, to view autism as disordered understanding of other individuals' intentions and goals due to problems with the mirror neuron system. This deficiency would explain the difficulty people with autism have in communicating with and understanding others. While most studies of the mirror neuron system and mu waves in people with autism have focused on simple motor tasks, some scientists speculate that these tests can be expanded to show that problems with the mirror neuron system underlie overarching cognitive and social deficits.

fMRI activation magnitudes in the inferior frontal gyrus increase with age in people with autism, but not in typically developing individuals. Furthermore, greater activation was associated with greater amounts of eye contact and better social functioning. Scientists believe the inferior frontal gyrus is one of the main neural correlates with the mirror neuron system in humans and is often related to deficits associated with autism. These findings suggest that the mirror neuron system may not be non-functional in individuals with autism, but simply abnormal in its development. This information is significant to the present discussion because mu waves may be integrating different areas of mirror neuron activity in the brain. Other studies have assessed attempts to consciously stimulate the mirror neuron system and suppress mu waves using neurofeedback (a type of biofeedback given through computers that analyze real time recordings of brain activity, in this case EEGs of mu waves). This type of therapy is still in its early phases of implementation for individuals with autism, and has conflicting forecasts for success.

== Brain–Computer Interfaces ==
Brain–computer interfaces (BCIs) are a developing technology that clinicians hope will one day bring more independence and agency to the severely physically disabled. This technology has the potential to help include people with near-total or total paralysis, such as those with tetraplegia (quadriplegia) or advanced amyotrophic lateral sclerosis (ALS); BCIs are intended to help them to communicate or even move objects such as motorized wheelchairs, neuroprostheses, or robotic grasping tools. Few of these technologies are currently in regular use by people with disabilities, but a diverse array are in development at an experimental level. One type of BCI uses event-related desynchronization (ERD) of the mu wave in order to control the computer. This method of monitoring brain activity takes advantage of the fact that when a group of neurons is at rest they tend to fire in synchrony with each other. When a participant is cued to imagine movement (an "event"), the resulting desynchronization (the group of neurons that was firing in synchronous waves now firing in complex and individualized patterns) can be reliably detected and analyzed by a computer. Users of such an interface are trained in visualizing movements, typically of the foot, hand, and/or tongue, which are each in different locations on the cortical homunculus and thus distinguishable by an electroencephalograph (EEG) or electrocorticograph (ECoG) recording of electrical activity over the motor cortex. In this method, computers monitor for a typical pattern of mu wave ERD contralateral to the visualized movement combined with event-related synchronization (ERS) in the surrounding tissue. This paired pattern intensifies with training, and the training increasingly takes the form of games, some of which utilize virtual reality. Some researchers have found that the feedback from virtual reality games is particularly effective in giving the user tools to improve control of his or her mu wave patterns. The ERD method can be combined with one or more other methods of monitoring the brain's electrical activity to create hybrid BCIs, which often offer more flexibility than a BCI that uses any single monitoring method.

== History ==
Mu waves have been studied since the 1930s, and are referred to as the wicket rhythm because the rounded EEG waves resemble croquet wickets. In 1950, Henri Gastaut and his coworkers reported desynchronization of these waves not only during active movements of their subjects, but also while the subjects observed actions executed by someone else. These results were later confirmed by additional research groups, including a study using subdural electrode grids in epileptic patients. The latter study showed mu suppression while the patients observed moving body parts in somatic areas of the cortex that corresponded to the body part moved by the actor. Further studies have shown that the mu waves can also be desynchronized by imagining actions and by passively viewing point-light biological motion.

== See also ==
=== Brain waves ===
- Delta wave – (0.5 – 4 Hz)
- Theta wave – (4 – 7 Hz)
- Alpha wave – (8 – 12 Hz)
- Mu wave – (8 – 13 Hz)
- SMR wave – (12.5 – 15.5 Hz)
  - Beta wave – (12.5 – 30 Hz)
- Gamma wave – (25 – 140 Hz)
