= Vladimir Pravdich-Neminsky =

Ukrainian physiologist (1879–1952)

Volodymyr Pravdich-Neminsky Владимир Правдич-Неминский
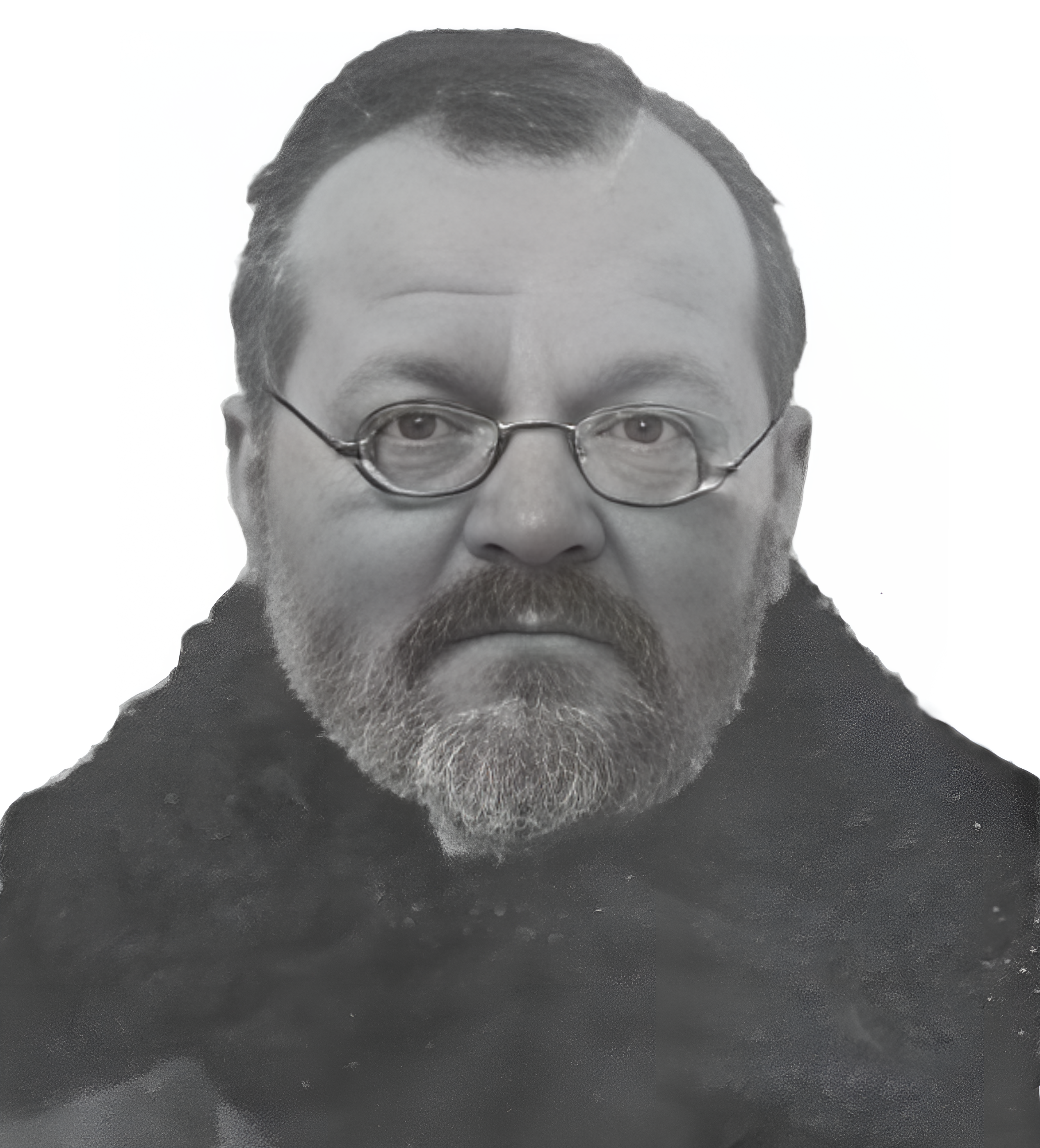
- Pravdych-Neminsky in 1929
- Born: 15 July 1879; Kyiv, Kiev Governorate, Russian Empire
- Died: 17 May 1952 (aged 72); Moscow, Russian SFSR, Soviet Union
- Citizenship: Russian Empire (1879–1917); Ukrainian People's Republic (1917–1920); USSR (1922–1952)
- Education: Taras Shevchenko National University of Kyiv
- Spouse: Alexandra Ludvigovna Pravdich-Neminskaia
- Children: Tatyana Pravdich-Neminskaia
- Scientific career
- Fields: Electrophysiology
- Workplaces: University of Kyiv

Vladimir Pravdich-Neminsky (Russian: Владимир Владимирович Правдич-Неминский, Ukrainian: Володимир Володимирович Правдич-Немінський; 2 July 1879 – 17 May 1952) was a Ukrainian physiologist who published the first EEG and the evoked potential of the mammalian brain. He was a representative of Kyiv Physiological School. He was a victim of Soviet repressions.

== Life ==
=== Family ===
Vladimir Pravdich-Neminsky was born in Kyiv in Polish-Ukrainian aristocratic family of Neminsky of Prawdzic coat of arms.

His father Volodymyr Stanislavovych had a rank of Active State Councillor. He owned 309 dessiatines (approximately 320 hectares or 850 acres) of farmland in Ivashkivtsi village in Podolia Governorate. In the beginning of the 20th century he lent it to local farmers. Little is known of Volodymyr Stanislavovych origin. There was an officer called Stanislav Neminsky (born 1809) in Russian Caucasian army in 1849 but it is unknown whether he is of any relation to Volodymyr. From 1901 to 1911, Volodymyr Stanislavovych worked as an officer in a chancery of Kyiv Land Bank. In 1899, he owned a house at Mykhailivska street 17. Later in 1909–1911 his address moved to Prozorivska street 6 (now Esplanadna, the building was demolished). Family also owned a country-side house in Kyiv suburb Pushcha-Vodytsia.

Volodymyr Stanislavovych also had a brother, Nikolai, who was also accountant officer in Kyiv Land Bank. He was a member of Russian nationalist organization Union of the Russian People in Kyiv. While Bolsheviks occupied Kyiv in 1919 he was executed by "Cheka" on May, 25. Possibly to avoid connotation with his uncle Volodymyr Jr. change his surname to "Prawdych-Neminsky".

Mother of Volodymyr Volodymyrovych was Anna Iuhymivna, who owned a house in Kyiv downtown at Malopidvalna 17, close to Mykhailivska 17.

There were another son in the family, Pavlo, of whom nothing is known except he was missing during the Ukrainian–Soviet War.

=== Study ===
Volodymyr attended First Kyiv Emperor Gymnasium, the most prestigious high school in Kyiv in that time, and graduated in 1900. He entered medical department of Kazan University a year later. In 1902 he moved to natural sciences section of physics and mathematics department to improve his knowledge in chemistry and biology. Volodymyr twice took part in students' demonstrations and twice was repressed for it so finished his course late.

In 1903, he came back to Kyiv to enter natural sciences section of physics and mathematics department of Kyiv University which he was graduated from in 1907 with I grade diploma in chemistry. In 1907 Volodymyr studied physical chemistry in lab of Kyiv Polytechnics Institute in laboratory of Volodymyr Tymofeiev and Volodymyr Plotnykov. With the later he made friends and their friendship lasted for many years. He authored one chapter in Plotnikov's doctoral thesis and had a publication on electrolysis of aluminum bromide compounds with toluene and benzene. These chemistry studies improved Neminsky's knowledge of chemical processes which he widely used in further research.

Sometime being in the University Volodymyr married Alexandra Ludwigovna. They had two daughters.

=== In St Vladimir Imperial University of Kyiv ===
In 1908, Neminsky enters physiology lab in Saint Vladimir Imperial University of Kyiv. From 1910, Vasyl Chagovets took the chair of physiology. Vasyl Chagovets (1873–1941) was Ukrainian and Russian physiologist. He studied in Emperors Military Medical Academy in St. Petersburg, in laboratory of Ivan Sechenov student physiologist Ivane Tarkhnishvili. In 1910 he was elected chair of physiology in medical department which he held till University close-up in 1920 and until 1935 in newly created Kyiv Medical Institute.

Nothing is known of Volodymyr Neminsky research in physiology before Chagovets as none of this was published. Possibly there was nothing important as he had to teach in gymnasium to support himself. Neminsky was a teacher of geography and natural science in 6th Kyiv Gymnasium around 1909. In 1910, Chagovets arrived and immediately applied for funding for improvement of physiology equipment. He got 20,000 golden roubles (appr. $10,000 of that time which with inflation correction means almost $250,000 in modern US dollars) and bought the most novel German equipment: galvanometers, kymograph, rheostats, microscopes, timers etc. He organized modern animal operation clinics taken as the specimen Pavlov's lab.

With newly bought equipment Neminsky eagerly started his experiments. He used recently invented Einthoven string galvanometer to record brain and muscle electrical signals. As a result of his research Neminsky published 2 papers in then well-known German journals Archiv für Physiologie and Zentralblatt für Physiologie (later merged into what we know now as Pflüger's Archive). Both were issued in 1913. First was a description of "action currents" in central nervous system of a frog. Another was historical work of non-invasive electric measuring on dog's brain. He found "spontaneous electric fluctuations" which he showed independent of blood pressure and peripheral nerves electric activity.

=== Wars and revolutions ===
From 1914 to 1917, Neminsky continued to teach in gymnasium and Kyiv Realschule and in 1915 entered 3rd year course of Medical Department of Kyiv University. While he graduated with excellent doctor diploma it was already 1917, the year of Russian and Ukrainian national revolutions. It was also the 4th year of World War I and a lot of educated people entered volunteer organization called "All-Russian Union of Towns" which helped wounded and refugees of war to survive. Volodymyr Neminsky joined "Union of Towns" as a volunteer doctor immediately after graduating and worked there till the end of the war in 1918. In 1918, he also starts research on mechanisms of fatigue in laboratory of pathology in Kyiv University, unfortunately, never published.

This was a time of frequent—15 times in a 3 years—authority changes. Ukrainian Central Rada was overtaken by Bolsheviks in January 1918 while German troops occupied Kyiv in March supporting Ukrainian government of general Skoropadsky. In December, Germans retreated as the World War II finished and Skoropadsky fell under pressure of Ukrainian socialist Petliura. In February 1919, Soviets enter the city again organizing massacre of their political opponents, including Volodymyr Neminsky's uncle Nikolai. In August united forces of Ukrainian army and Russian "White" Army made Bolsheviks to withdraw Kyiv, but only to return in December again. In May and June 1920, Kyiv was taken for a short time by union of Polish and Ukrainian armies, after which Soviet regime was established constantly.

For Volodymyr Neminsky it was a time of great dangers. Russian-speaking nobility of Polish-Ukrainian descent could be an aim to different forces. In this period he changes his name adding "Pravdych" possibly to hide his family relation to killed uncle. As epidemics of typhus spread Neminsky was mobilized by Bolsheviks in 1919 to fight it in Bacteriology Institute. He conducted wide clinical investigations which were not published as well as his other works of this period. Later on he was sent by the Soviets to the 12th Red Army as ordinator (doctor) of evacuation hospital. There he fell sick with typhus himself.

There are some little understandable reasons which took Neminsky away from Chagovets. But nevertheless there were no other works except mentioned above co-authored by great physiologists. Neither are not known any interaction between them in following years. Neminsky came back to University shortly in 1918–1919 though not to Chagovets lab but to Lindeman's. Later he worked in Polytechnics, Ukrainian Academy of Sciences, Agricultural Institute, Institute of Child's and Mother's Health—but never in Kyiv Medical Institute where Chagovets remained until his retirement in 1936.

== Life in USSR ==
During Ukrainian–Soviet War in 1919 he was mobilized to Red Army to fight epidemic typhus while he fell ill too.

From 1922 to 1929, he worked in different research institutions in Ukraine. In late 1929, he was arrested and sentenced to 3 years prison in Arkhangelsk. From 1932 to 1944, he was teaching physiology in a few colleges and universities being every time fired and accused as a member of "old regime bourgeois intellectuals".

In 1949, Pravdich-Neminsky was allowed to live and work in Moscow which meant all accusations were taken off. He was a head in Laboratory of Cerebrography of USSR Academy of Sciences until death.

== Works ==
- Pravdich-Neminsky VV. Ein Versuch der Registrierung der elektrischen Gehirnerscheinungen. Zbl Physiol 27: 951–960, 1913.
- Pravdich-Neminsky. Sur la conaissance du rythme d'innervation. Journ. de méd. d'Ekaterinoslaw Nr. 13-14. 1923.
- Práwdicz-Neminski WW. Zur Kenntnis der elektrischen und der Innervationsvorgänge in den funktionellen Elementen und Geweben des tierischen Organismus. Elektrocerebrogramm der Säugetiere. Pflug Arch ges Physiol, 209, 362-382. 1925 doi:10.1007/BF01730925
- Práwdicz-Neminski WW. Zur Kenntnis der elektrischen und der Innervationsvorgänge in den funktionellen Elementen und Geweben des tierischen Organismus. Pflug Arch ges Physiol 207, 1, 671-690. 1925 doi:10.1007/BF01740394
- Práwdicz-Neminski WW. Anschauliche Methode der fraktionierten Blutgerinnungsbestimmung. 1927 doi:10.1007/BF02622816
- Práwdicz-Neminski WW. Zur Kenntnis der elektrischen und der Innervationsvorgänge in den funktionellen Elementen und Geweben des tierischen Organismus. Pflug Arch ges Physiol, 209, 1, 362-382. 1925 doi:10.1007/BF01722884
- Pravdich-Neminsky, V. V. (1951). "Tonoelectrocerebrogram" [Tonoelectrocerebrogram]. Doklady Akademii Nauk SSSR. 79 (6): 1061–1064. PMID 14860077.
- Pravdich-Neminsky, V. V. (1951). "Structural modifications in the nerve during exposure to direct current" [Structural modifications in the nerve during exposure to direct current]. Doklady Akademii Nauk SSSR. 78 (3): 397–399. PMID 14840314.
- Электроцеребрография, электромиография и значение ионов аммония в жизненных процессах организма. 1958

== Sources ==
- К. М. Быков (1958), "В. В. Правдич-Неминский", Электроцеребрография, электромиография и значение ионов аммония в жизненных процессах организма
- "Профессор В.В. Правдич-Неминский (к 100-летию со дня рождения)". Нейрофизиология. 11 (4): 393–394. 1979.
- Ernst Niedermeyer, F. H. Lopes da Silva, ed. (2005). Electroencephalography: Basic Principles, Clinical Applications, and Related Fields (5 ed.). Lippincott Williams & Wilkins. pp. 3–4. ISBN 0-7817-5126-8.
- Brainclinics "Pioneers of the EEG, episode 4: Vladimir Pravdich Neminsky" (on youtube)
