= Decoded neurofeedback =

Decoded Neurofeedback (DecNef) is the process of inducing knowledge in a subject by increasing neural activation in predetermined regions in the brain, such as the visual cortex. This is achieved by measuring neural activity in these regions via functional magnetic resonance imaging (fMRI), comparing this to the ideal pattern of neural activation in these regions (for the intended purpose), and giving subjects feedback on how close their current pattern of neural activity is to the ideal pattern. Without explicit knowledge of what they are supposed to be doing or thinking about, over time participants learn to induce this ideal pattern of neural activation. Corresponding to this, their 'knowledge' or way of thinking has been found to change accordingly.

Experiments conducted in 2011 at Boston University (BU) and ATR Computational Neuroscience Laboratories in Kyoto, Japan demonstrated that volunteers were able to quickly solve complex visual puzzles they had not previously had exposure to. They did so by receiving the brain patterns of other volunteers who had already learned to solve the puzzles through trial and error methods.

Neurofeedback, commonly referred to as EEG biofeedback, is a real-time method of measuring and adjusting brain activity such that the brain is rewarded at the appropriate time. This non-pharmaceutical approach to treating a variety of diseases, such as anxiety, ADHD, and depression, is based on notions of neuroplasticity and learning. Neurofeedback is used by Neuroperforma to assist patients in reaching their utmost wellbeing.

The research has far-reaching implications for treating patients with various learning disabilities, mental illness, memory problems, and motor functionality impairments.
