= Theta wave =

Neural oscillatory pattern

A sample EEG theta wave

Theta waves generate the theta rhythm, a neural oscillation in the brain that underlies various aspects of cognition and behavior, including learning, memory, and spatial navigation in humans and many other mammals. It can be recorded using various electrophysiological methods, such as electroencephalogram (EEG), recorded either from inside the brain or from electrodes attached to the scalp.

At least two types of theta rhythm have been described. The hippocampal theta rhythm is a strong oscillation that can be observed in the hippocampus and other brain structures in humans and many other mammals. "Cortical theta rhythms" are low-frequency components of scalp EEG, usually recorded from humans. Theta rhythms can be quantified using quantitative electroencephalography (qEEG) using freely available toolboxes, such as, EEGLAB or the Neurophysiological Biomarker Toolbox (NBT).

In rats, theta wave rhythmicity is easily observed in the hippocampus, but can also be detected in numerous other cortical and subcortical brain structures. Hippocampal theta waves, with a frequency range of 6–10 Hz, appear when a rat is engaged in active motor behavior such as walking or exploratory sniffing, and also during REM sleep. Theta waves with a lower frequency range, usually around 6–7 Hz, are sometimes observed when a rat is motionless but alert. When a rat is eating, grooming, or sleeping, the hippocampal EEG usually shows a non-rhythmic pattern known as large irregular activity or LIA. The hippocampal theta rhythm depends critically on projections from the medial septal area, which in turn receives input from the hypothalamus and several brainstem areas. Hippocampal theta rhythms in other species differ in some respects from those in rats. In cats and rabbits, the frequency range is lower (around 4–6 Hz), and theta is less strongly associated with movement than in rats. In bats, theta appears in short bursts associated with echolocation.

In humans, hippocampal theta rhythm has been observed and linked to memory formation and navigation. As with rats, humans exhibit hippocampal theta wave activity during REM sleep. Humans also exhibit predominantly cortical theta wave activity during REM sleep. Increased sleepiness is associated with decreased alpha wave power and increased theta wave power. Meditation has been shown to increase theta power.

The function of the hippocampal theta rhythm is not clearly understood. Green and Arduini, in the first major study of this phenomenon, noted that hippocampal theta usually occurs together with desynchronized EEG in the neocortex, and proposed that it is related to arousal. Vanderwolf and his colleagues, noting the strong relationship between theta and motor behavior, have argued that it is related to sensorimotor processing. Another school, led by John O'Keefe, have suggested that theta is part of the mechanism animals use to keep track of their location within the environment. Another theory links the theta rhythm to mechanisms of learning and memory (Hasselmo, 2005). This theory states that theta waves may act as a switch between encoding and recall mechanisms, and experimental data on rodents and humans support this idea. Another study on humans has shown that theta oscillations determine memory function (encoding or recall) when interacting with high frequency gamma activity in the hippocampus. These findings support the idea that theta oscillations support memory formation and retrieval in interaction with other oscillatory rhythms. These different theories have since been combined, as it has been shown that the firing patterns can support both navigation and memory.

In human EEG studies, the term theta refers to frequency components in the 4–7 Hz range, regardless of their source. Cortical theta is observed frequently in young children. In older children and adults, it tends to appear during meditative, drowsy, hypnotic or sleeping states, but not during the deepest stages of sleep. Theta from the midfrontal cortex is specifically related to cognitive control and alterations in these theta signals are found in multiple psychiatric and neurodevelopmental disorders.

== History ==
Although there were a few earlier hints, the first clear description of regular slow oscillations in the hippocampal EEG came from a paper written in German by Jung and Kornmüller (1938). They were not able to follow up on these initial observations, and it was not until 1954 that further information became available, in a very thorough study by John D. Green and Arnaldo Arduini that mapped out the basic properties of hippocampal oscillations in cats, rabbits, and monkeys (Green and Arduini, 1954). Their findings provoked widespread interest, in part because they related hippocampal activity to arousal, which was at that time the hottest topic in neuroscience. Green and Arduini described an inverse relationship between hippocampal and cortical activity patterns, with hippocampal rhythmicity occurring alongside desynchronized activity in the cortex, whereas an irregular hippocampal activity pattern was correlated with the appearance of large slow waves in the cortical EEG.

Over the following decade came an outpouring of experiments examining the pharmacology and physiology of theta. By 1965, Charles Stumpf was able to write a lengthy review of "Drug action on the electrical activity of the hippocampus" citing hundreds of publications (Stumpf, 1965), and in 1964 John Green, who served as the leader of the field during this period, was able to write an extensive and detailed review of hippocampal electrophysiology (Green, 1964). A major contribution came from a group of investigators working in Vienna, including Stumpf and Wolfgang Petsche, who established the critical role of the medial septum in controlling hippocampal electrical activity, and worked out some of the pathways by which it exerts its influence.

== Terminology ==
Because of a historical accident, the term "theta rhythm" is used to refer to two different phenomena, "hippocampal theta" and "human cortical theta". Both of these are oscillatory EEG patterns, but they may have little in common beyond the name "theta".

In the oldest EEG literature dating back to the 1920s, Greek letters such as alpha, beta, theta, and gamma were used to classify EEG waves falling into specific frequency ranges, with "theta" generally meaning a range of about 4–7 cycles per second (Hz). In the 1930s–1950s, a very strong rhythmic oscillation pattern was discovered in the hippocampus of cats and rabbits (Green & Arduini, 1954). In these species, the hippocampal oscillations fell mostly into the 4–6 Hz frequency range, so they were referred to as "theta" oscillations. Later, hippocampal oscillations of the same type were observed in rats; however, the frequency of rat hippocampal EEG oscillations averaged about 8 Hz and rarely fell below 6 Hz. Thus the rat hippocampal EEG oscillation should not, strictly speaking, have been called a "theta rhythm". However the term "theta" had already become so strongly associated with hippocampal oscillations that it continued to be used even for rats. Over the years this association has come to be stronger than the original association with a specific frequency range, but the original meaning also persists.

Thus, "theta" can mean either of two things:

1. A specific type of regular oscillation seen in the hippocampus and several other brain regions connected to it.
2. EEG oscillations in the 4–7 Hz frequency range, regardless of where in the brain they occur or what their functional significance is.

The first meaning is usually intended in literature that deals with rats or mice, while the second meaning is usually intended in studies of human EEG recorded using electrodes glued to the scalp. In general, it is not safe to assume that observations of "theta" in the human EEG have any relationship to the "hippocampal theta rhythm". Scalp EEG is generated almost entirely by the cerebral cortex, and even if it falls into a certain frequency range, this cannot be taken to indicate that it has any functional dependence on the hippocampus.

== Hippocampal ==
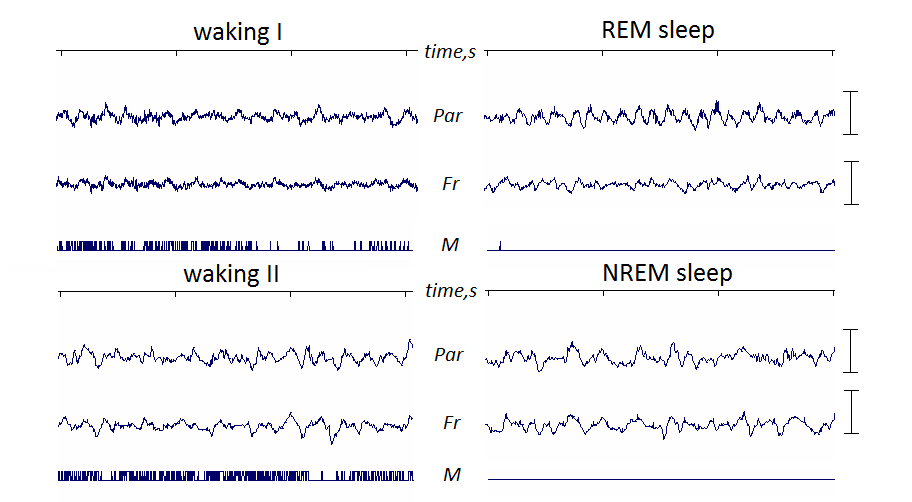
The sample of mouse EEG. Theta rhythm is prominent during part of awaking and REM sleep.

Due to the density of its neural layers, the hippocampus generates some of the largest EEG signals of any brain structure. In some situations the EEG is dominated by regular waves at 4–10 Hz, often continuing for many seconds. This EEG pattern is known as the hippocampal theta rhythm. It has also been called Rhythmic Slow Activity (RSA), to contrast it with the large irregular activity (LIA) that usually dominates the hippocampal EEG when theta is not present.

In rats, hippocampal theta is seen mainly in two conditions: first, when an animal is running, walking, or in some other way actively interacting with its surroundings; second, during REM sleep. The frequency of the theta waves increases as a function of running speed, starting at about 6.5 Hz on the low end, and increasing to about 9 Hz at the fastest running speeds, although higher frequencies are sometimes seen for brief high-velocity movements such as jumps across wide gaps. In larger species of animals, theta frequencies are generally lower. The behavioral dependency also seems to vary by species: in cats and rabbits, theta is often observed during states of motionless alertness. This has been reported for rats as well, but only when they are fearful (Sainsbury et al., 1987).

Theta is not just confined to the hippocampus. In rats, it can be observed in many parts of the brain, including nearly all that interact strongly with the hippocampus. The generation of the rhythm is dependent on the medial septal area: this area projects to all of the regions that show theta rhythmicity, and destruction of it eliminates theta throughout the brain (Stewart & Fox, 1990).

=== Type 1 and type 2 ===
In 1975 Kramis, Bland, and Vanderwolf proposed that in rats there are two distinct types of hippocampal theta rhythm, with different behavioral and pharmacological properties (Kramis et al., 1975). Type 1 ("atropine resistant") theta, according to them, appears during locomotion and other types of "voluntary" behavior and during REM sleep, has a frequency usually around 8 Hz, and is unaffected by the anticholinergic drug atropine. Type 2 ("atropine sensitive") theta appears during immobility and during anesthesia induced by urethane, has a frequency in the 4–7 Hz range, and is eliminated by administration of atropine. Many later investigations have supported the general concept that hippocampal theta can be divided into two types, although there has been dispute about the precise properties of each type. Type 2 theta is comparatively rare in unanesthetized rats: it may be seen briefly when an animal is preparing to make a movement but hasn't yet executed it, but has only been reported for extended periods in animals that are in a state of frozen immobility because of the nearby presence of a predator such as a cat or ferret (Sainsbury et al., 1987).

=== Relationship with behavior ===
Vanderwolf (1969) made a strong argument that the presence of theta in the hippocampal EEG can be predicted on the basis of what an animal is doing, rather than why the animal is doing it. Active movements such as running, jumping, bar-pressing, or exploratory sniffing are reliably associated with theta; inactive states such as eating or grooming are associated with LIA. Later studies showed that theta frequently begins several hundred milliseconds before the onset of movement, and that it is associated with the intention to move rather than with feedback produced by movement (Whishaw & Vanderwolf, 1973). The faster an animal runs, the higher the theta frequency. In rats, the slowest movements give rise to frequencies around 6.5 Hz, the fastest to frequencies around 9 Hz, although faster oscillations can be observed briefly during very vigorous movements such as large jumps.

=== Mechanisms ===
Numerous studies have shown that the medial septal area plays a central role in generating hippocampal theta (Stewart & Fox, 1990). Lesioning the medial septal area, or inactivating it with drugs, eliminates both type 1 and type 2 theta. Under certain conditions, theta-like oscillations can be induced in hippocampal or entorhinal cells in the absence of septal input, but this does not occur in intact, undrugged adult rats. The critical septal region includes the medial septal nucleus and the vertical limb of the diagonal band of Broca. The lateral septal nucleus, a major recipient of hippocampal output, probably does not play an essential role in generating theta.

The medial septal area projects to a large number of brain regions that show theta modulation, including all parts of the hippocampus as well as the entorhinal cortex, perirhinal cortex, retrosplenial cortex, medial mamillary and supramammillary nuclei of the hypothalamus, anterior nuclei of the thalamus, amygdala, inferior colliculus, and several brainstem nuclei (Buzsáki, 2002). Some of the projections from the medial septal area are cholinergic; the rest are GABAergic or glutamatergic. It is commonly argued that cholinergic receptors do not respond rapidly enough to be involved in generating theta waves, and therefore that GABAergic and/or glutamatergic signals (Ujfalussy and Kiss, 2006) must play the central role.

A major research problem has been to discover the "pacemaker" for the theta rhythm, that is, the mechanism that determines the oscillation frequency. The answer is not yet entirely clear, but there is some evidence that type 1 and type 2 theta depend on different pacemakers. For type 2 theta, the supramammillary nucleus of the hypothalamus appears to exert control (Kirk, 1998). For type 1 theta, the picture is still unclear, but the most widely accepted hypothesis proposes that the frequency is determined by a feedback loop involving the medial septal area and hippocampus (Wang, 2002).

Several types of hippocampal and entorhinal neurons are capable of generating theta-frequency membrane potential oscillations when stimulated. Typically these are sodium-dependent voltage-sensitive oscillations in membrane potential at near-action potential voltages (Alonso & Llinás, 1989). Specifically, it appears that in neurons of the CA1 and dentate gyrus, these oscillations result from an interplay of dendritic excitation via a persistent sodium current (I_{NaP}) with perisomatic inhibition (Buzsáki, 2002).

==== Generators ====
As a rule, EEG signals are generated by synchronized synaptic input to the dendrites of neurons arranged in a layer. The hippocampus contains multiple layers of very densely packed neurons—the dentate gyrus and the CA3/CA1/subicular layer—and therefore has the potential to generate strong EEG signals. Basic EEG theory says that when a layer of neurons generates an EEG signal, the signal always phase-reverses at some level. Thus, theta waves recorded from sites above and below a generating layer have opposite signs. There are other complications as well: the hippocampal layers are strongly curved, and theta-modulated inputs impinge on them from multiple pathways, with varying phase relationships. The outcome of all these factors is that the phase and amplitude of theta oscillations change in a very complex way as a function of position within the hippocampus. The largest theta waves, however, are generally recorded from the vicinity of the fissure that separates the CA1 molecular layer from the dentate gyrus molecular layer. In rats, these signals frequently exceed 1 millivolt in amplitude. Theta waves recorded from above the hippocampus are smaller, and polarity-reversed with respect to the fissure signals.

The strongest theta waves are generated by the CA1 layer, and the most significant input driving them comes from the entorhinal cortex, via the direct EC→CA1 pathway. Another important driving force comes from the CA3→CA1 projection, which is out of phase with the entorhinal input, leading to a gradual phase shift as a function of depth within CA1 (Brankack, et al. 1993). The dentate gyrus also generates theta waves, which are difficult to separate from the CA1 waves because they are considerably smaller in amplitude, but there is some evidence that dentate gyrus theta is usually about 90 degrees out of phase from CA1 theta. Direct projections from the septal area to hippocampal interneurons also play a role in generating theta waves, but their influence is much smaller than that of the entorhinal inputs (which are, however, themselves controlled by the septum).

=== Research findings ===
Theta-frequency activity arising from the hippocampus is manifested during some short-term memory tasks (Vertes, 2005). Studies suggest that these rhythms reflect the "on-line" state of the hippocampus; one of readiness to process incoming signals (Buzsáki, 2002). Conversely, theta oscillations have been correlated to various voluntary behaviors (exploration, spatial navigation, etc.) and alert states (goose bumps, etc.) in rats (Vanderwolf, 1969), suggesting that it may reflect the integration of sensory information with motor output (for review, see Bland & Oddie, 2001). A large body of evidence indicates that theta rhythm is likely involved in spatial learning and navigation (Buzsáki, 2005).

Theta rhythms are very strong in rodent hippocampi and entorhinal cortex during learning and memory retrieval, and are believed to be vital to the induction of long-term potentiation, a potential cellular mechanism of learning and memory. Phase precession along the theta wave in the hippocampus permits neural signals representing events that are only expected or those from the recent past to be placed next to the actually ongoing ones along a single theta cycle, and to be repeated over several theta cycles. This mechanism is supposed to allow long term potentiation (LTP) to reinforce the connections between neurons of the hippocampus representing subsequent elements of a memory sequence. Indeed, it has been suggested that stimulation at the theta frequency is optimal for the induction of hippocampal LTP. Based on evidence from electrophysiological studies showing that both synaptic plasticity and strength of inputs to hippocampal region CA1 vary systematically with ongoing theta oscillations (Hyman et al., 2003; Brankack et al., 1993), it has been suggested that the theta rhythm functions to separate periods of encoding of current sensory stimuli and retrieval of episodic memory cued by current stimuli so as to avoid interference that would occur if encoding and retrieval were simultaneous.

== Humans and other primates ==
In non-human animals, EEG signals are usually recorded using electrodes implanted in the brain; the majority of theta studies have involved electrodes implanted in the hippocampus. In humans, because invasive studies are not ethically permissible except in some neurological patients, the largest number of EEG studies have been conducted using electrodes glued to the scalp. The signals picked up by scalp electrodes are comparatively small and diffuse and arise almost entirely from the cerebral cortex for the hippocampus is too small and too deeply buried to generate recognizable scalp EEG signals. Human EEG recordings show clear theta rhythmicity in some situations, but because of the technical difficulties, it has been difficult to tell whether these signals have any relationship with the hippocampal theta signals recorded from other species.

In contrast to the situation in rats, where long periods of theta oscillations are easily observed using electrodes implanted at many sites, theta has been difficult to pin down in primates, even when intracortical electrodes have been available. Green and Arduini (1954), in their pioneering study of theta rhythms, reported only brief bursts of irregular theta in monkeys. Other investigators have reported similar results, although Stewart and Fox (1991) described a clear 7–9 Hz theta rhythm in the hippocampus of urethane-anesthetized macaques and squirrel monkeys, resembling the type 2 theta observed in urethane-anesthetized rats.

Most of the available information on human hippocampal theta comes from a few small studies of epileptic patients with intracranially implanted electrodes used as part of a treatment plan. In the largest and most systematic of these studies, Cantero et al. (2003) found that oscillations in the 4–7 Hz frequency range could be recorded from both the hippocampus and neocortex. The hippocampal oscillations were associated with REM sleep and the transition from sleep to waking, and came in brief bursts, usually less than a second long. Cortical theta oscillations were observed during the transition from sleep and during quiet wakefulness; however, the authors were unable to find any correlation between hippocampal and cortical theta waves, and concluded that the two processes are probably controlled by independent mechanisms.

Studies have shown an association of hypnosis with stronger theta-frequency activity as well as with changes to the gamma-frequency activity (Jensen et al., 2015). Also, increased theta waves have been seen in humans in 'no thought' meditation.

== Role in learning and cognitive control ==
Theta oscillations play a significant role in various cognitive processes, including learning and cognitive control. Research has shown that these oscillations are closely associated with memory encoding and retrieval, emotional regulation, and the maintenance of cognitive tasks.

Theta activity has been linked to the encoding of new information and the retrieval of memories. In particular, studies have indicated that increased theta oscillations are present during tasks that require active memory engagement. For instance, theta-phase locking of single neurons has been observed during spatial memory tasks, suggesting that the timing of neuronal firing in relation to theta waves is crucial for effective memory processing.

In the context of cognitive control, theta oscillations are believed to reflect the maintenance of task rules and stimulus-action associations. Research indicates that during cognitive control tasks, increased theta amplitude is observed in frontal brain regions, which are critical for decision-making and behavioral regulation. Specifically, theta activity is thought to support mechanisms that allow individuals to adapt their behavior based on changing environmental demands and internal goals. This dynamic interplay between theta oscillations and cognitive control processes highlights how these brain rhythms contribute to efficient task performance. Moreover, evidence from non-invasive brain stimulation has uncovered a causal role of theta oscillations on the allocation of cognitive resources toward anticipating cognitive conflict by modulation of phase-amplitude coupling in the prefrontal cortex, specifically the superior frontal gyrus.

== See also ==
- Epilepsy

=== Brain waves ===
- Delta wave — (0.1–4 Hz)
- Theta wave — (4–8 Hz)
- Alpha wave — (8–12 Hz)
- Mu wave — (7.5–12.5 Hz)
- SMR wave — (12.5–15.5 Hz)
- Beta wave — (16–31 Hz)
- Gamma wave — (32–100 Hz)
