= Gamma wave =

Neural oscillation in the 25–140Hz range

Gamma waves

A gamma wave or gamma rhythm is a pattern of neural oscillation in humans with a frequency between 30 and 100 Hz, the 40 Hz point being of particular interest. Gamma waves with frequencies between 30 and 70 hertz may be classified as low gamma, and those between 70 and 150 hertz as high gamma. Gamma rhythms are correlated with large-scale brain network activity and cognitive phenomena such as working memory, attention, and perceptual grouping, and can be increased in amplitude via meditation or neurostimulation. Altered gamma activity has been observed in many mood and cognitive disorders such as Alzheimer's disease, epilepsy, and schizophrenia.

== Discovery ==
Gamma waves can be detected by electroencephalography or magnetoencephalography. One of the earliest reports of gamma wave activity was recorded from the visual cortex of awake monkeys. Subsequently, significant research activity has concentrated on gamma activity in visual cortex.

Gamma activity has also been detected and studied across premotor, parietal, temporal, and frontal cortical regions. Gamma waves constitute a common class of oscillatory activity in neurons belonging to the cortico-basal ganglia-thalamo-cortical loop. Typically, this activity is understood to reflect feedforward connections between distinct brain regions, in contrast to alpha wave feedback across the same regions. Gamma oscillations have also been shown to correlate with the firing of single neurons, mostly inhibitory neurons, during all states of the wake-sleep cycle. Gamma wave activity is most prominent during alert, attentive wakefulness. However, the mechanisms and substrates by which gamma activity may help to generate different states of consciousness remain unknown.

=== Controversy ===
Some researchers contest the validity or meaningfulness of gamma wave activity detected by scalp EEG, because the frequency band of gamma waves overlaps with the electromyographic (EMG) frequency band. Thus, gamma signal recordings could be contaminated by muscle activity. Studies utilizing muscle paralysis techniques have confirmed that scalp EEG recordings do contain significant EMG signal, and these signals can be traced to local motor dynamics such as saccade rate or other motor actions involving the head. Advances in signal processing and separation, such as the application of independent component analysis or other techniques based on spatial filtering, have been proposed to reduce the presence of EMG artifacts.

In at least some EEG textbooks, users are instructed to put an electrode on an eyelid to catch these, as well as 1 on the heart, & a pair on the sides of the neck, to catch muscle-signal from the body below the neck.

== Function ==
=== Conscious perception ===
Electrocorticographic movie showing changes in high-frequency broadband gamma activity in specific cortical regions when visual stimuli are presented during a face-/place-naming task

Gamma waves may participate in the formation of coherent, unified perception, also known as the problem of combination in the binding problem, due to their apparent synchronization of neural firing rates across distinct brain regions. 40 Hz gamma waves were first suggested to participate in visual consciousness in 1988, e.g. two neurons oscillate synchronously (though they are not directly connected) when a single external object stimulates their respective receptive fields. Subsequent experiments by many others demonstrated this phenomenon in a wide range of visual cognition. In particular, Francis Crick and Christof Koch in 1990 argued that there is a significant relation between the binding problem and the problem of visual consciousness and, as a result, that synchronous 40 Hz oscillations may be causally implicated in visual awareness as well as in visual binding. Later the same authors expressed skepticism over the idea that 40 Hz oscillations are a sufficient condition for visual awareness.

A number of experiments conducted by Rodolfo Llinás supports a hypothesis that the basis for consciousness in awake states and dreaming is 40 Hz oscillations throughout the cortical mantle in the form of thalamocortical iterative recurrent activity. In two papers entitled "Coherent 40-Hz oscillation characterizes dream state in humans" (Rodolfo Llinás and Urs Ribary, Proc Natl Acad Sci USA 90:2078-2081, 1993) and "Of dreaming and wakefulness" (Llinas & Pare, 1991), Llinás proposes that the conjunction into a single cognitive event could come about by the concurrent summation of specific and nonspecific 40 Hz activity along the radial dendritic axis of given cortical elements, and that the resonance is modulated by the brainstem and is given content by sensory input in the awake state and intrinsic activity during dreaming. According to Llinás' hypothesis, known as the thalamocortical dialogue hypothesis for consciousness, the 40 Hz oscillation seen in wakefulness and in dreaming is proposed to be a correlate of cognition, resultant from coherent 40 Hz resonance between thalamocortical-specific and nonspecific loops. In Llinás & Ribary (1993), the authors propose that the specific loops give the content of cognition, and that a nonspecific loop gives the temporal binding required for the unity of cognitive experience.

A lead article by Andreas K. Engel et al. in the journal Consciousness and Cognition (1999) that argues for temporal synchrony as the basis for consciousness, defines the gamma wave hypothesis thus:

The hypothesis is that synchronization of neuronal discharges can serve for the integration of distributed neurons into cell assemblies and that this process may underlie the selection of perceptually and behaviorally relevant information.

=== Attention ===
The suggested mechanism is that gamma waves relate to neural consciousness via the mechanism for conscious attention:

The proposed answer lies in a wave that, originating in the thalamus, sweeps the brain from front to back, 40 times per second, drawing different neuronal circuits into synch with the precept [sic], and thereby bringing the precept [sic] into the attentional foreground. If the thalamus is damaged even a little bit, this wave stops, conscious awarenesses do not form, and the patient slips into profound coma.

Thus the claim is that when all these neuronal clusters oscillate together during these transient periods of synchronized firing, they help bring up memories and associations from the visual percept to other notions. This brings a distributed matrix of cognitive processes together to generate a coherent, concerted cognitive act, such as perception. This has led to theories that gamma waves are associated with solving the binding problem.

Gamma waves are observed as neural synchrony from visual cues in both conscious and subliminal stimuli. This research also sheds light on how neural synchrony may explain stochastic resonance in the nervous system.

== Clinical relevance ==
=== Mood disorders ===
Altered gamma wave activity is associated with mood disorders such as major depression or bipolar disorder and may be a potential biomarker to differentiate between unipolar and bipolar disorders. For example, human subjects with high depression scores exhibit differential gamma signaling when performing emotional, spatial, or arithmetic tasks. Increased gamma signaling is also observed in brain regions that participate in the default mode network, which is normally suppressed during tasks requiring significant attention. Rodent models of depression-like behaviors also exhibit deficient gamma rhythms.

=== Schizophrenia ===
Decreased gamma-wave activity is observed in schizophrenia. Specifically, the amplitude of gamma oscillations is reduced, as is the synchrony of different brain regions involved in tasks such as visual oddball and Gestalt perception. People with schizophrenia perform worse on these behavioral tasks, which relate to perception and continuous recognition memory. The neurobiological basis of gamma dysfunction in schizophrenia is thought to lie with GABAergic interneurons involved in known brain wave rhythm-generating networks. Antipsychotic treatment, which diminishes some behavioral symptoms of schizophrenia, does not restore gamma synchrony to normal levels.

=== Epilepsy ===
Gamma oscillations are observed in the majority of seizures and may contribute to their onset in epilepsy. Visual stimuli such as large, high-contrast gratings that are known to trigger seizures in photosensitive epilepsy also drive gamma oscillations in visual cortex. During a focal seizure event, maximal gamma rhythm synchrony of interneurons is always observed in the seizure onset zone, and synchrony propagates from the onset zone over the whole epileptogenic zone.

=== Alzheimer's disease ===
Enhanced gamma band power and lagged gamma responses have been observed in patients with Alzheimer's disease (AD). Interestingly, the tg APP-PS1 mouse model of AD exhibits decreased gamma oscillation power in the lateral entorhinal cortex, which transmits various sensory inputs to the hippocampus and thus participates in memory processes analogous to those affected by human AD. Decreased hippocampal slow gamma power has also been observed in the 3xTg mouse model of AD.

Gamma stimulation may have therapeutic potential for AD and other neurodegenerative diseases. Optogenetic stimulation of fast-spiking interneurons in the gamma-wave frequency range was first demonstrated in mice in 2009. Entrainment or synchronization of hippocampal gamma oscillations and spiking to 40 Hz via non-invasive stimuli in the gamma-frequency band, such as flashing lights or pulses of sound, reduces amyloid beta load and activates microglia in the well-established 5XFAD mouse model of AD. Subsequent human clinical trials of gamma band stimulation have shown mild cognitive improvements in AD patients who have been exposed to light, sound, or tactile stimuli in the 40 Hz range. However, the precise molecular and cellular mechanisms by which gamma band stimulation ameliorates AD pathology is unknown.

=== Fragile X syndrome ===
Hypersensitivity and memory deficits due to Fragile X syndrome may be linked to gamma rhythm abnormalities in the sensory cortex and hippocampus. For example, decreased synchrony of gamma oscillations has been observed in the auditory cortex of FXS patients. The FMR1 knockout rat model of FXS exhibits an increased ratio of slow (~25–50 Hz) to fast (~55–100 Hz) gamma waves.

== Other functions ==
=== Meditation ===
High-amplitude gamma wave synchrony can be self-induced via meditation. Long-term practitioners of meditation such as Tibetan Buddhist monks exhibit both increased gamma-band activity at baseline as well as significant increases in gamma synchrony during meditation, as determined by scalp EEG. fMRI on the same monks revealed greater activation of right insular cortex and caudate nucleus during meditation. The neurobiological mechanisms of gamma synchrony induction are thus highly plastic. This evidence may support the hypothesis that one's sense of consciousness, stress management ability, and focus, often said to be enhanced after meditation, are all underpinned by gamma activity. At the 2005 annual meeting of the Society for Neuroscience, the current Dalai Lama commented that if neuroscience could propose a way to induce the psychological and biological benefits of meditation without intensive practice, he "would be an enthusiastic volunteer."

=== Death ===
Elevated gamma activity has also been observed in the brain around the time of death. In a 2013 study, electroencephalography (EEG) recordings from rats undergoing experimental cardiac arrest revealed a transient surge of synchronized gamma oscillations within roughly the first 30 seconds after the heart stopped, preceding the isoelectric ("flat") EEG. This activity was global across the cortex and highly coherent, and it showed cross-frequency coupling and directed connectivity at levels exceeding the normal waking state.

A 2023 study extended these findings to humans by analyzing EEG and electrocardiogram signals from four comatose patients before and after the withdrawal of ventilatory support. Two of the four patients exhibited a rapid and marked surge of gamma power following the onset of global hypoxia—increasing by a factor ranging from roughly 2- to 391-fold relative to baseline—together with increased cross-frequency coupling of gamma waves with slower oscillations and increased interhemispheric functional and directed connectivity in the gamma band. The activity was concentrated in the temporo-parieto-occipital junction, a posterior region sometimes described as a "hot zone" thought to be important for conscious processing.

Because gamma oscillations are associated with conscious awareness, the authors proposed that these surges may represent a neural correlate of covert consciousness, potentially relevant to the vivid near-death experiences reported by some survivors of cardiac arrest. They cautioned against strong conclusions: the sample was very small, the two patients who showed the surge both had a documented history of seizures (though none occurred in the hours before death), and because the patients did not survive, the observed activity could not be correlated with any reported subjective experience. Earlier commentators had similarly argued that comparable activity in animals, while intriguing, was unlikely on its own to account for near-death experiences.

== See also ==
=== Brain waves ===
- Delta wave – (0.1 – 4 Hz)
- Theta wave – (4 – 7 Hz)
- Mu wave – (7.5 – 12.5 Hz)
- SMR wave – (12.5 – 15.5 Hz)
- Alpha wave – (7 (or 8) – 12 Hz)
- Beta wave – (12 – 30 Hz)
- Gamma wave – (32 – 100 Hz)
- High-frequency oscillations – (over ~80 Hz)
