= Hans Berger =

German psychiatrist (1873-1941)

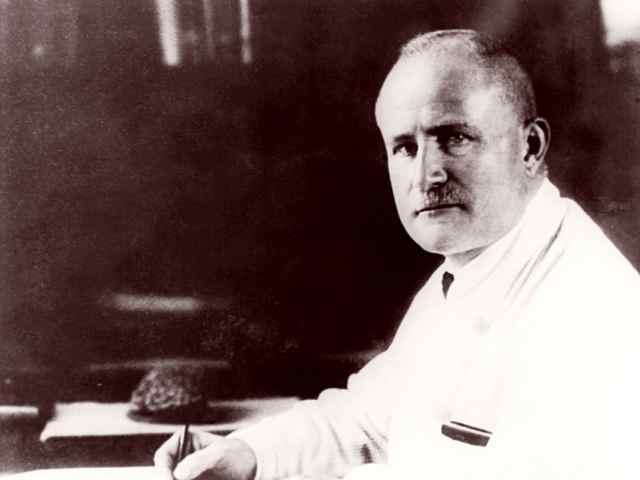
- Born: 21 May 1873; Neuses, Saxe-Coburg and Gotha, German Empire
- Died: 1 June 1941 (aged 68); Jena, Germany
- Education: University of Jena
- Known for: Electroencephalograms; discovery of the alpha wave rhythm
- Spouse: Baroness Ursula von Bülow
- Scientific career
- Fields: Psychiatry

Hans Berger (21 May 1873 – 1 June 1941) was a German psychiatrist. He is best known as the inventor of electroencephalography (EEG) in 1924, which is a method used for recording the electrical activity of the brain, commonly described in terms of brainwaves, and as the discoverer of the alpha wave rhythm which is a type of brainwave. Alpha waves have been eponymously referred to as the "Berger wave".

== Biography ==
Berger was born in Neuses (now part of Coburg), Saxe-Coburg and Gotha, Germany.

After attending Casimirianum, where he gained his abitur in 1892, Berger enrolled as a mathematics student at the Friedrich Schiller University of Jena with the intention of becoming an astronomer. After one semester, he abandoned his studies and enlisted for a year of service in the cavalry. During a training exercise, his horse suddenly reared, and he landed in the path of a horse-drawn cannon. The driver of the artillery battery halted the horses in time, leaving the young Berger shaken but with no serious injuries. His sister, at home many kilometres away, had a feeling he was in danger and insisted their father telegram him. The incident made such an impression on Berger that, years later in 1940, he wrote: "It was a case of spontaneous telepathy in which at a time of mortal danger, and as I contemplated certain death, I transmitted my thoughts, while my sister, who was particularly close to me, acted as the receiver."

On completion of his military service, and obsessed by the idea of how his mind could have carried a signal to his sister, Berger returned to Jena to study medicine with the goal of discovering the physiological basis of "psychic energy." His central theme became "the search for the correlation between objective activity in the brain and subjective psychic phenomena."

After obtaining his medical degree from Jena in 1897, Berger joined the staff of Otto Ludwig Binswanger (1852–1929), who held the chair in psychiatry and neurology at the Jena clinic. Habilitated in 1901, he qualified as a senior university lecturer in 1906 and physician-in-chief in 1912, eventually succeeding Binswanger in 1919. He also collaborated with two famous scientists and physicians, Oskar Vogt (1870–1959) and Korbinian Brodmann (1868–1918), in their research on lateralization of brain function. Berger married his technical assistant, Baroness Ursula von Bülow, in 1911 and later served as an army psychiatrist on the Western front during World War I. He was elected Rector of Jena University in 1927.

In 1924, Berger succeeded in recording the first human electroencephalogram (EEG), a term he coined. Filled with doubt, he took five years to publish his first paper in 1929, which demonstrated the technique for "recording the electrical activity of the human brain from the surface of the head." His findings were met with incredulity and derision by the German medical and scientific establishments. Having visited the EEG laboratory at Jena in 1935, American roboticist William Grey Walter noted that Berger:

... was not regarded by his associates as in the front rank of German psychiatrists, having rather the reputation of being a crank. He seemed to me to be a modest and dignified person, full of good humour, and as unperturbed by lack of recognition as he was later by the fame it eventually brought upon him. But he had one fatal weakness: he was completely ignorant of the technical and physical basis of his method. He knew nothing about mechanics or electricity.

After British electrophysiologists Edgar Douglas Adrian and B. H. C. Matthews confirmed Berger's basic observations in 1934, the importance of his discoveries in electroencephalography (EEG) was finally recognized at an international forum in 1937. By 1938, electroencephalography had gained widespread recognition by eminent researchers in the field, leading to its practical use in diagnosis in the United States, England, and France. In 1938, at the retirement age of 65, Berger was made Professor Emeritus in Psychology. According to biographers Niedermeyer and Lopes da Silva, the appointment occurred in an unceremonious manner as his relationship with the Nazi regime was particularly strained. Numerous sources report that, given their hostile relationship, the Nazis forced Berger into retirement that same year with a complete ban of any further work on EEG. These biographical accounts were contradicted in 2005 by Ernst Klee, a German journalist specializing in the exposure and documentation of Nazi medical crimes. In 2005, Dr. Susanne Zimmermann, medical historian at the University of Jena, found evidence that Berger had not been forced into retirement but had "served on the selection committee for his successor" Berthold Kihn, who was sacked as a Nazi after the war. Moreover, official records at the University of Jena dating from the 1930s proved that Berger had served on the Erbgesundheitsgericht (Court for Genetic Health) that imposed sterilizations, while his diaries contained anti-Semitic comments. Dr Zimmermann's findings corroborated research published in Germany in 2003, documenting Berger's invitation by the SS racial hygienist Karl Astel to work for the EGOG (Erbgesundheitsobergericht, Higher Genetic Health Court) in 1941. Berger replied: "I am gladly willing to work again as an assessor at the Court for Genetic Health in Jena, for which I thank you." Berger did not join the SS, SA, or Nazi Party "despite the significant Nazification of the University of Jena, but was a supporting SS member, possibly for self-protection."

After a long period of clinical depression, and suffering from a severe skin infection, Berger died from suicide by hanging on June 1, 1941, in the southern wing of the clinic.

== Research ==
Among his many research interests in neurology, Berger studied brain circulation, psychophysiology, and brain temperature. One of his early experiments on the brain involved a gentleman with a cranial defect that left part of the brain exposed. The gentleman allowed Berger to insert a liquid-filled rubber tube through the hole in his skull. A latex cap sealed the opening, creating a pressure gauge. At the other end of the rubber tube was a pen that recorded the pressure fluctuations on paper wrapped around a rotating drum. Berger noticed that the pen recorded waves that would change when he asked his conscious participant to perform different cognitive tasks. He also observed changes when the participant experienced changes in emotions or sensory stimulation. Berger followed this work with his most significant contribution to modern science. British physician, Richard Caton (1842-1926), had previously described electrical potentials recorded from the exposed cortices of dogs and nonhuman apes. Berger's patient gave him the opportunity to apply Caton's technique to a human. The result was the first demonstration of human electroencephalography (EEG). In 1924, Berger made the first EEG recording of human brain activity and called it Elektrenkephalogramm.

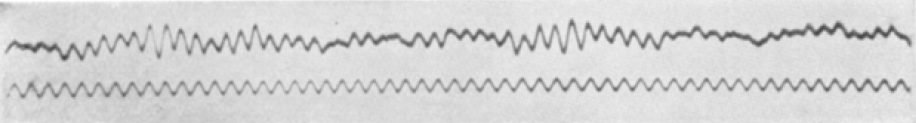
An early EEG recording done by Berger

Using the EEG, he was also the first to describe the different waves or rhythms that were present in the normal and abnormal brain, such as the alpha wave rhythm (7.812 to 13.28 Hz), also known as "Berger's wave"; and its suppression (substitution by the faster beta waves) when the subject opens the eyes (the so-called alpha blockade). He also studied and described for the first time the nature of EEG alterations in brain diseases such as epilepsy.

His method involved inserting silver wires under the patients scalp, one at the front of the head and one at the back. Later, he used silver foil electrodes attached to the head by a rubber bandage. As a recording device, he first used the Lippmann capillary electrometer, but results were disappointing. He then switched to the string galvanometer and later to a double-coil Siemens recording galvanometer, which allowed him to record electrical voltages as small as one ten-thousandth of a volt. The resulting output, up to three seconds in duration, was then photographed by an assistant.

The EEG has been a useful tool in modern medical and psychological practices by allowing clinicians to describe and diagnose various conditions and diseases. If an individual goes to get an EEG, the doctor will look at the waveform patterns to determine how different stimuli affect the brain. These waveform patterns are called evoked potentials or EPs. If a patient's brain waves do not follow the normal EP pattern, that is an indication of a deficit in the processing of the stimuli. There are also event-related potentials, or ERPs, which provide information about mental processing of patients. Both EPs and ERPs are tools that can help doctors determine any abnormalities. The studies researching ERPs have also been helpful in the development of the brain mapping technique.

== Hans-Berger-Preis ==
A prize awarded triennially by the Deutsche Gesellschaft für Klinische Neurophysiologie (German Society of Clinical Neurophysiology) for long-standing, extensive academic work in theoretical or clinical neurophysiology was named after Berger: the Hans-Berger-Preis. In 2021, however, in part due to Berger's and other namesakes' work's associations with the Nazi regime (e.g., Gottlob Berger), the society decided to rename all its awards to a purely factual description: The Hans-Berger-Preis is now the "Medal of Merit for Lifetime Achievement in Neurophysiology and Functional Imaging".

== See also ==
- Sleep medicine

== Sources ==
=== Print ===
Primary sources

- Berger, Hans (1929). Über das Elektrenkephalogramm des Menschen. Archiv für Psychiatrie und Nervenkrankheiten, 87: 527–570.
- Berger, Hans (1940). Psyche. Jena: Gustav Fischer.

Secondary sources

- Fields, R. Douglas (2009). The Other Brain: From Dementia to Schizophrenia. New York: Simon & Schuster. ISBN 978-0-7432-9141-5
- Klee, Ernst (2005). Das Personenlexikon zum Dritten Reich: Wer war was vor und nach 1945. Frankfurt am Main: Fischer-Taschenbuch-Verlag. ISBN 3-596-16048-0
- Hoßfeld Uwe, John Jürgen, Lemuth Oliver, Stutz Rüdiger (2003). "Kämpferische Wissenschaft" - Studien zur Universität Jena im Nationalsozialismus., Köln: Böhlau Verlag Gmbh. ISBN 3-412-04102-5.
- Niedermeyer, Ernst and Lopes da Silva, Fernando (2005). Electroencephalography: Basic Principles, Clinical Applications, and Related Fields. Baltimore: Lippincott Williams & Wilkins (5th Edition). ISBN 0-7817-5126-8
- Radin, Dean (2006). Entangled Minds. New York: Paraview Pocket Books. ISBN 1-4165-1677-8
- Walter, W. Grey (1953). The Living Brain. New York: Norton.

=== Online ===
- Andreae, H. (Feb 5, 1967). "To the great psychiatrist, Professor Hans Berger, an exemplary physician and genial researcher. In the 25th year of remembrance (1873-1941)". Deutsches Medizinisches Journal. 18 (3): 83–4. PMID 4876739.
- Blakemore, Colin (1977). Mechanics of the Mind. London: Cambridge University Press. pp. 49–51..
- Cortez, P.; Crotez-Sărmăşanu, M. L. (1976). "Hans Berger (1873-1941)". Revista de medicină internă, neurologie, psihiatrie, neurochirurgie, dermato-venerologie. Neurologie, psihiatrie, neurochirurgie. 21 (4): 304–5. PMID 799341.
- Fischgold, H. (1962). "Hans Berger and his time". Actualités Neurophysiologiques. 4: 197–221. PMID 14072351.
- Fischgold, H. (1967). "Hans Berger and his time". Beiträge zur Neurochirurgie. 14: 7–11. PMID 4873369.
- Gerhard, U-J; Schönberg, A.; Blanz, B. (Mar 2005). "Hans Berger and the Legend of the Nobel Prize". Fortschritte der Neurologie-Psychiatrie. 73 (3): 156–60. doi:10.1055/s-2004-830086. PMID 15747225. S2CID 260134191.
- Gloor, P. (Sep 1969). "The Work of Hans Berger". Electroencephalography and Clinical Neurophysiology. 27 (7): 649. doi:10.1016/0013-4694(69)91207-3. PMID 4187257.
- Gloor, P. (1969). "Hans Berger and the discovery of the electroencephalogram". Electroencephalography and Clinical Neurophysiology: Suppl 28:1–36. PMID 4188910.
- Haas, L. F. (Jan 2003). "Hans Berger (1873–1941), Richard Caton (1842–1926), and electroencephalography". Journal of Neurology, Neurosurgery & Psychiatry. 74 (1): 9. doi:10.1136/jnnp.74.1.9. PMC 1738204. PMID 12486257.
- Karbowski, K. (Aug 2002). "Hans Berger (1873-1941)". Journal of Neurology, Neurosurgery & Psychiatry. 249 (8): 1130–1. doi:10.1007/s00415-002-0872-4. PMID 12420722. S2CID 32730261.
- Klapetek, J. (Oct 10, 1969). "Reminiscence of Hans Berger". Dtsch. Med. Wochenschr. 94 (41): 2123–6. PMID 4898295.
- Kolle, K. (Apr 10, 1970). "40 years of Electroencephalography (EEG). In memoriam Hans Berger". Münchener medizinische Wochenschrift (1950). 112 (5): 712–3. PMID 4939408.
- Millett, D. (2001). "Hans Berger: From Psychic Energy to the EEG". Perspectives in Biology and Medicine. 44 (4): 522–42. doi:10.1353/pbm.2001.0070. PMID 11600799. S2CID 30664678.
- Schulte, W. (May 29, 1959). "Hans Berger: a biography of the discoverer of the electroencephalogram". Münchener medizinische Wochenschrift (1950). 101 (22): 977–80. PMID 13674375.
- Tudor, Mario; Tudor, Lorainne; Tudor, Katarina Ivana (2005). "Hans Berger (1873-1941): the history of electroencephalography". Acta Medica Croatica. 59 (4): 307–13. PMID 16334737.
- Walsa, R. (Oct 20, 1991). "Hans Berger (1873-1941)". Orvosi Hetilap. 132 (42): 2327–30. PMID 1945370.
- Wieczorek, V. (Aug 1991). "In memory of Hans Berger: Inventor of the human electroencephalogram". Der Nervenarzt. 62 (8): 457–9. PMID 1944707.
- Wiedemann, H. R. (Oct 1994). "Hans Berger (1873-1941)". European Journal of Pediatrics. 153 (10): 705. doi:10.1007/BF01954482. PMID 7813523. S2CID 35348899.
