= Beta wave =

Neural oscillation in the brain, 12.5–30 Hz

Beta waves

Beta waves, or beta rhythm, are neural oscillations (brainwaves) in the brain with a frequency range of between 12.5 and 30 Hz (12.5 to 30 cycles per second). Several different rhythms coexist, with some being inhibitory and others excitory in function.

Beta waves can be split into three sections: Low Beta Waves (12.5–16 Hz, "Beta 1"); Beta Waves (16.5–20 Hz, "Beta 2"); and High Beta Waves (20.5–28 Hz, "Beta 3"). Beta states are the states associated with normal waking consciousness.

== History ==
Beta waves were discovered and named by the German psychiatrist Hans Berger, who invented electroencephalography (EEG) in 1924, as a method of recording electrical brain activity from the human scalp. Berger termed the larger amplitude, slower frequency waves that appeared over the posterior scalp when the subject's eyes were closed alpha waves. The smaller amplitude, faster frequency waves that replaced alpha waves when the subject opened their eyes were then termed beta waves.

== Function ==
Low-amplitude beta waves with multiple and varying frequencies are often associated with active, busy or anxious thinking and active concentration.

Over the motor cortex, beta waves are associated with the muscle contractions that happen in isotonic movements and are suppressed prior to and during movement changes, with similar observations across fine and gross motor skills. Bursts of beta activity are associated with a strengthening of sensory feedback in static motor control and reduced when there is movement change. Beta activity is increased when movement has to be resisted or voluntarily suppressed. The artificial induction of increased beta waves over the motor cortex by a form of electrical stimulation called Transcranial alternating-current stimulation consistent with its link to isotonic contraction produces a slowing of motor movements.

Investigations of reward feedback have revealed two distinct beta components; a high beta (low gamma) component, and low beta component. In association with unexpected gains, the high beta component is more profound when receiving an unexpected outcome, with a low probability. However the low beta component is said to be related to the omission of gains, when gains are expected.

During rest, fast beta oscillations are prevalent over lateral prefrontal cortex (LPFC) in humans, following a posteroanterior increase in frequency. This increase beta frequency at more anterior subregions corresponds to an anatomical model of LPFC function wherein cognitive control is hierarchically organized, with more abstract and sophisticated control mechanisms subserved by the most anterior regions and more direct//concrete control of goal-directed action at posterior sites. This is further in agreement with the fact that posterior LPFC beta is slower in frequency, similar to that observed over resting motor cortex.

== Relationship with GABA ==
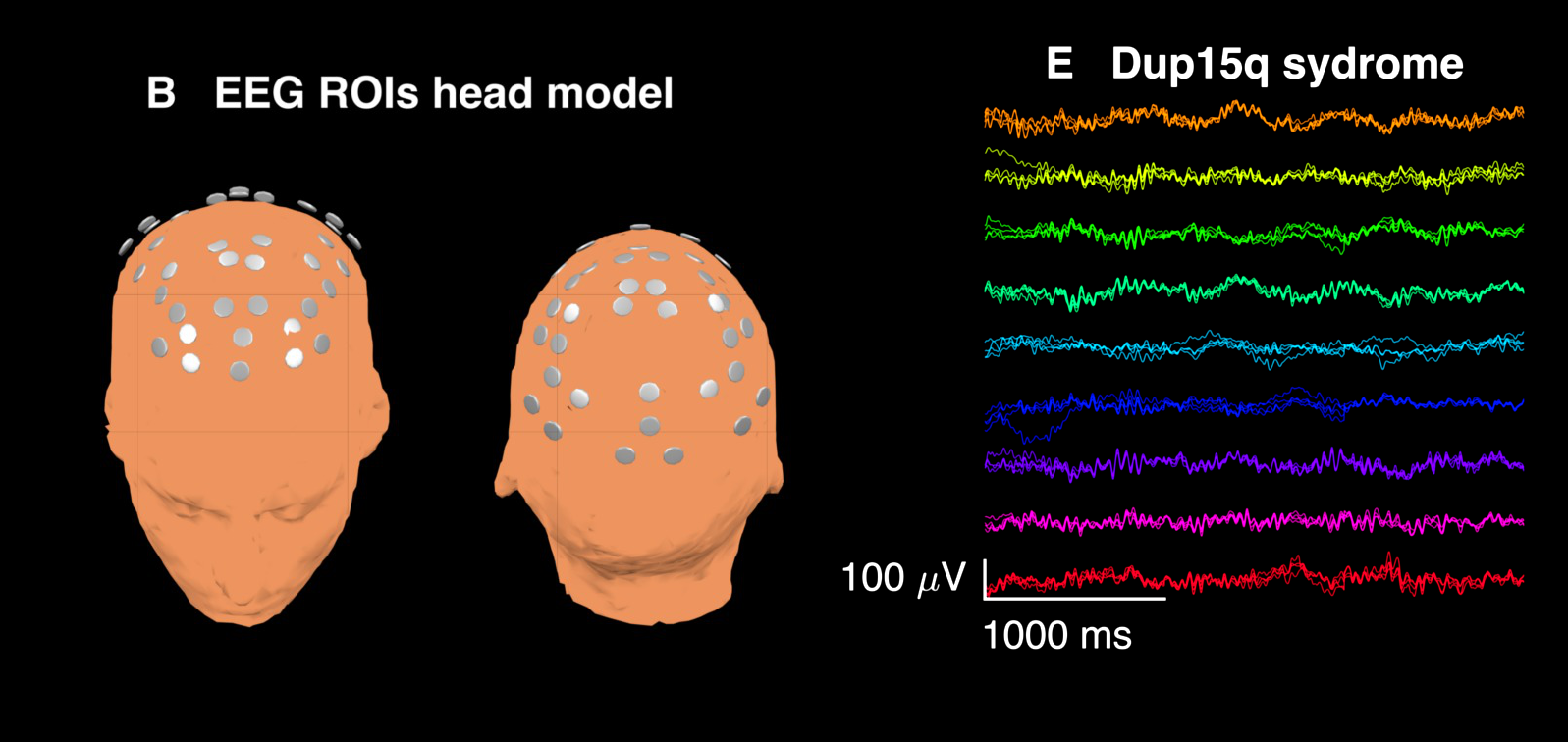
Diffuse beta waves present alongside other frequencies in spontaneous EEG recorded from a 28-month-old child with Dup15q syndrome.

Beta waves are often considered indicative of inhibitory cortical transmission mediated by gamma aminobutyric acid (GABA), the principal inhibitory neurotransmitter of the mammalian nervous system. Benzodiazepines, drugs that modulate GABA_{A} receptors, induce beta waves in EEG recordings from humans and rats. Spontaneous beta waves are also observed diffusely in scalp EEG recordings from children with duplication 15q11.2-q13.1 syndrome (Dup15q) who have duplications of GABA_{A} receptor subunit genes GABRA5, GABRB3, and GABRG3. Similarly, children with Angelman syndrome with deletions of the same GABA_{A} receptor subunit genes feature diminished beta amplitude. Thus, beta waves are likely biomarkers of GABAergic dysfunction, especially in neurodevelopmental disorders caused by 15q deletions/duplications.

== See also ==
=== Brainwaves ===
- Delta wave – (0.1 – 3 Hz)
- Theta wave – (4 – 7 Hz)
- Alpha wave – (7 – 12 Hz)
- Beta wave – (12 – 30 Hz)
- Gamma wave – (30 – 100 Hz)
