= Slow-wave sleep =

Period of sleep in humans and other animals

Simplified hypnogram with slow-wave sleep level shown.

Ostriches sleeping, with REM and slow-wave sleep phases

Slow-wave sleep (SWS), often referred to as deep sleep, is the third stage of non-rapid eye movement sleep (NREM), where electroencephalography activity is characterised by slow delta waves.

Slow-wave sleep usually lasts between 70 and 90 minutes, taking place during the first hours of the night. Slow-wave sleep is characterised by moderate muscle tone, slow or absent eye movement, and lack of genital activity. Slow-wave sleep is considered important for memory consolidation, declarative memory, and the recovery of the brain from daily activities.

Before 2007, the term slow-wave sleep referred to the third and fourth stages of NREM. Current terminology combined these into a single stage three.

== Overview ==
=== Terminology ===
This period of sleep is called slow-wave sleep because the EEG activity is synchronized, and characterised by slow waves with a frequency range of 0.5–4.5 Hz and a relatively high amplitude power with peak-to-peak amplitude greater than 75 μV. The first section of the wave signifies a "down state", an inhibition or hyperpolarizing phase in which the neurons in the neocortex are silent. This is the period when the neocortical neurons can rest. The second section of the wave signifies an "up state", an excitation or depolarizing phase in which the neurons fire briefly at a high rate. The principal characteristics during slow-wave sleep that contrast with REM sleep are moderate muscle tone, slow or absent eye movement, and lack of genital activity.

Before 2007, the American Academy of Sleep Medicine (AASM) divided slow-wave sleep into stages 3 and 4. The two stages are now combined as Stage Three or N3. An epoch (30 seconds of sleep) that consists of 20% or more slow-wave (delta) sleep is now considered slow-wave sleep.

=== Importance ===
Slow-wave sleep is considered important for memory consolidation. This is sometimes referred to as "sleep-dependent memory processing". Impaired memory consolidation has been seen in individuals with primary insomnia, who thus do not perform as well as those who are healthy in memory tasks following a period of sleep. Furthermore, slow-wave sleep improves declarative memory (which includes semantic and episodic memory). A central model has been hypothesized that long-term memory storage is facilitated by an interaction between the hippocampal and neocortical networks. In several studies, after the subjects have had the training to learn a declarative memory task, the density of human sleep spindles present was significantly higher than the signals observed during the control tasks, which involved similar visual stimulation and cognitively-demanding tasks but did not require learning. This associated with the spontaneously occurring wave oscillations that account for the intracellular recordings from thalamic and cortical neurons.

Specifically, SWS presents a role in spatial declarative memory. Reactivation of the hippocampus during SWS is detected after the spatial learning task. In addition, a correlation can be observed between the amplitude of hippocampal activity during SWS and the improvement in spatial memory performance, such as route retrieval, on the following day. Additionally, studies have found that when odour cues are given to subjects during sleep, this stage of sleep exclusively allows contextual cues to be reactivated after sleep, favoring their consolidation. A separate study found that when subjects hear sounds associated with previously shown pictures of locations, the reactivation of individual memory representations was significantly higher during SWS as compared to other sleep stages.

Affective representations are generally better remembered during sleep compared to neutral ones. Emotions with negative salience presented as a cue during SWS show better reactivation, and therefore an enhanced consolidation in comparison to neutral memories. The former was predicted by sleep spindles over SWS, which discriminates the memory processes during sleep as well as facilitating emotional memory consolidation. Acetylcholine plays an essential role in hippocampus-dependent memory consolidation. An increased level of cholinergic activity during SWS is known to be disruptive to memory processing. Considering that acetylcholine is a neurotransmitter that modulates the direction of information flow between the hippocampus and neocortex during sleep, its suppression is necessary during SWS to consolidate sleep-related declarative memory.

Sleep deprivation studies with humans suggest that the primary function of slow-wave sleep may be to allow the brain to recover from its daily activities. Glucose metabolism in the brain increases as a result of tasks that demand mental activity. Another function affected by slow-wave sleep is the secretion of growth hormone, which is always greatest during this stage. It is also thought to be responsible for a decrease in sympathetic and increase in parasympathetic neural activity.

== Electroencephalographic characteristics ==
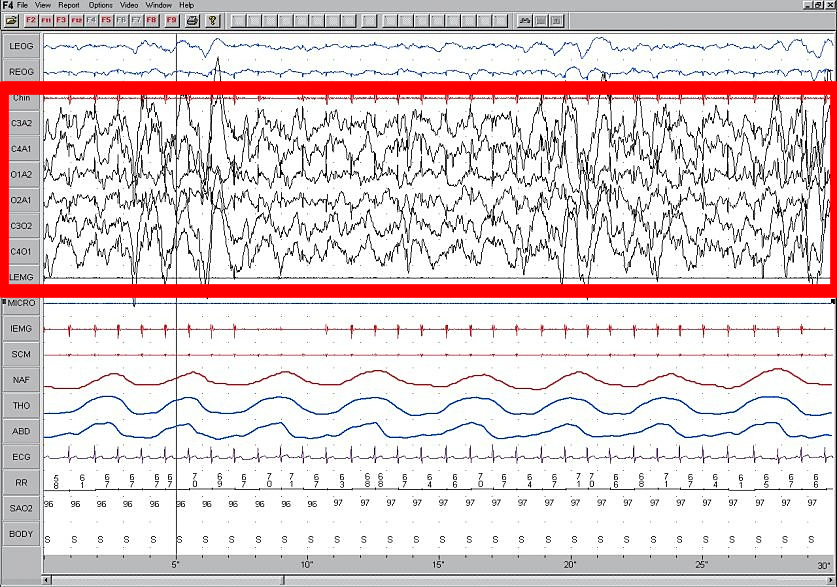
Polysomnogram demonstrating SWS, stage four. High amplitude EEG is highlighted in red.

Large 75-microvolt (0.5–2.0 Hz) delta waves predominate the electroencephalogram (EEG). Stage N3 is defined by the presence of 20% delta waves in any given 30-second epoch of the EEG during sleep, by the current 2007 AASM guidelines.

Longer periods of SWS occur in the first part of the night, primarily in the first two sleep cycles (roughly three hours). Children and young adults will have more total SWS in a night than older adults. The elderly may not go into SWS at all during many nights of sleep.

NREM sleep, as observed on the electroencephalogram (EEG), is distinguished by certain characteristic features. Sleep spindles, marked by spindle-like changes in the amplitude of 12–14 Hz oscillations, K complexes lasting at least 0.5 seconds, consisting of a distinct negative sharp wave followed by a positive component, and slow waves or delta waves characterized by slow frequency (< 2 Hz) and high amplitude (> 75 μV) are key indicators. The presence and distribution of sleep spindle activity and slow waves vary across NREM sleep, leading to its subdivision into stages 1–3. While slow waves and sleep spindles are present in stages 2 and 3, stage 2 sleep is characterized by a higher prevalence of spindles, while slow waves dominate the EEG during stage 3.

Slow-wave sleep is an active phenomenon probably brought about by the activation of serotonergic neurons of the raphe system.

The slow wave seen in the cortical EEG is generated through recurrent connections within the cerebral cortex, where cortical pyramidal cells excite one another in a positive feedback loop. This recurrent excitation is balanced by inhibition, resulting in the active state of the slow oscillation of slow wave sleep. Failure of this mechanism results in a silencing of activity for a brief period. The recurrence of active and silent periods occurs at a rate of 0.5–4 Hz, giving rise to the slow waves of the EEG seen during slow wave sleep.

== Functions ==
=== Neural control of slow-wave sleep ===
Several neurotransmitters are involved in sleep and waking patterns: acetylcholine, norepinephrine, serotonin, histamine, and orexin. Neocortical neurons fire spontaneously during slow-wave sleep, thus they seem to play a role during this period of sleep. Also, these neurons appear to have some form of internal dialogue, which accounts for the mental activity during this state where there is no information from external signals (because of the synaptic inhibition at the thalamic level). The rate of recall of dreams during this state of sleep is relatively high compared to the other levels of the sleep cycle. This indicates that mental activity is closer to real-life events.

=== Physical healing and growth ===
Slow-wave sleep is the constructive phase of sleep for recuperation of the mind-body system in which it rebuilds itself after each day. Substances that have been ingested into the body while an organism is awake are synthesized into complex proteins of living tissue. Growth hormone is also secreted during this stage, which leads some scientists to hypothesize that a function of slow-wave sleep is to facilitate the healing of muscles as well as repair damage to tissues. Lastly, glial cells within the brain are restored with sugars to provide energy for the brain.

=== Learning and synaptic homeostasis ===
Learning and memory formation occur during wakefulness by the process of long-term potentiation; SWS is associated with the regulation of synapses thus potentiated. SWS is involved in the downscaling of synapses, in which strongly stimulated or potentiated synapses are kept while weakly potentiated synapses either diminish or are removed. This may be helpful for recalibrating synapses for the next potentiation during wakefulness and for maintaining synaptic plasticity. Notably, new evidence is showing that reactivation and rescaling may be co-occurring during sleep.

== Problems associated with slow-wave sleep ==
Bedwetting, night terrors, and sleepwalking are all common behaviors that can occur during stage three of sleep. These occur most frequently amongst children, who generally outgrow them. Another problem that may arise is sleep-related eating disorder. An individual will sleep-walk seeking out food, and will eat not having any memory of the event in the morning. Over half of individuals with this disorder become overweight. Sleep-related eating disorder can usually be treated with dopaminergic agonists, or topiramate, which is an anti-seizure medication. Heredity may be factor with this disorder.

=== Effects of sleep deprivation ===
J. A. Horne (1978) reviewed several experiments with humans and concluded that sleep deprivation has no effects on people's physiological stress response or ability to perform physical exercise. It did, however, have an effect on cognitive functions. Some people reported distorted perceptions or hallucinations and a lack of concentration on mental tasks. Thus, the major role of sleep does not appear to be rest for the body but rest for the brain.

When sleep-deprived humans sleep normally again, the recovery percentage for each stage of sleep is not the same. Only seven percent of stages one and two are regained, but 68 percent of stage-four slow-wave sleep and 53 percent of REM sleep are regained. This suggests that stage-four sleep (known today as the deepest part of stage-three sleep) is more important than the other stages.

During slow-wave sleep, there is a significant decline in cerebral metabolic rate and cerebral blood flow. The activity falls to about 75 percent of the normal wakefulness level. The regions of the brain that are most active when awake have the highest level of delta waves during slow-wave sleep. This indicates that the rest is geographical. The "shutting down" of the brain accounts for the grogginess and confusion if someone is awakened during deep sleep since it takes the cerebral cortex time to resume its normal functions.

According to J. Siegel (2005), sleep deprivation results in the build-up of free radicals and superoxides in the brain. Free radicals are oxidizing agents that have one unpaired electron, making them highly reactive. These free radicals interact with electrons of biomolecules and damage cells. In slow-wave sleep, the decreased rate of metabolism reduces the creation of oxygen byproducts, thereby allowing the existing radical species to clear. This is a means of preventing damage to the brain.

=== Amyloid beta pathology ===
A number of research studies have shown that sleep affects amyloid beta (Aβ) dynamics. A good candidate for slow wave activity (SWA), which occurs during deep non-REM sleep, is Aβ modulation. The researchers also highlighted a strong relationship between Aβ and SWA, pointing out that increased disruption in SWA is correlated with elevated levels of Aβ. Hence, Slow waves of non-rapid eye movement sleep are disrupted or decrease when Aβ builds up in the prefrontal cortex. As a result, this may hinder older people's capacity for memory consolidation.

Moreover, the onset of Alzheimer's disease is marked by the deposition of amyloid beta (Aβ) in the brain. Alzheimer's disease is distinguished by the presence of Aβ plaques and neurofibrillary tangles. These structural anomalies are linked to disruptions in the sleep-wake cycle, particularly in non-REM slow wave sleep. Thus, individuals diagnosed with Alzheimer's often experience disturbances in sleep, resulting in diminished levels of non-rapid eye movement sleep and reduced slow wave activity, which is a prominent brain rhythm during deep non-REM sleep. Similarly, even cognitively healthy individuals with detectable Aβ exhibit sleep disturbances, characterized by compromised sleep quality and an increased frequency of daytime napping.

== Individual differences ==
Though slow-wave sleep is fairly consistent within the individual, it can vary across individuals. Individual variations seem to be influenced by demographic factors such as gender and age.

Slow-wave sleep and slow-wave activity undergo significant transformations throughout one's lifespan, with aging serving as a particularly influential factor in predicting individual variations. Aging is inversely proportional to the amount of SWS beginning by midlife, so slow-wave sleep declines with age. Moreover, recent findings indicate that older individuals exhibit a decreased inclination for daytime sleep compared to younger counterparts, and this decline persists even when accounting for variations in habitual sleep duration. This age-related decrease in daytime sleep propensity is evident in middle-aged individuals and coincides with statistically significant reductions in total sleep time, slow-wave sleep, and slow-wave activity.

Sex differences have also been found, such that females tend to have higher levels of slow-wave sleep than males, at least up until menopause. Older individuals exhibit gender-based variations in non-rapid eye movement (NREM) sleep, where women demonstrate increased slow-wave sleep during both regular and recuperative sleep. There have also been studies that have shown differences between races. The results showed that there was a lower percentage of slow-wave sleep in African Americans compared to Caucasians, but since there are many influencing factors (e.g., body mass index, sleep-disordered breathing, obesity, diabetes, and hypertension), this potential difference must be investigated further.

Mental disorders play a role in individual differences in the quality and quantity of slow-wave sleep: subjects with depression show a lower amplitude of slow-wave activity compared to healthy participants. Sex differences also persist in the former group: depressed men present significantly lower slow-wave amplitude. This sex divergence is twice as large as the one observed in healthy subjects. However, no age-related difference concerning slow-wave sleep can be observed in the depressed group.

== Brain regions ==
During sleep, the distribution of slow-wave activity (SWA) typically exhibits a prevalence in the frontal region of the brain. In the subsequent recovery sleep after experiencing sleep deprivation, the frontal cortex exhibits the most significant rise in slow-wave activity (SWA) compared to the temporal region, parietal region, and occipital region. The notable increase in SWA following sleep deprivation in the frontal areas, coupled with the prevailing presence of SWA in the frontal regions even during baseline sleep, has been construed as evidence supporting the involvement of slow-wave sleep (SWS) in functions typically linked to the frontal cortices. Thus, the prevalence of slow-wave sleep (SWS) in the frontal regions, particularly those linked to advanced cognitive functions or cognitive regions highly active during wakefulness, underscores the considerable importance of SWS.

Some of the brain regions implicated in the induction of slow-wave sleep include:

- The parafacial zone (GABAergic neurons), located within the medulla oblongata
- the nucleus accumbens core (GABAergic medium spiny neurons; specifically, the subset of these neurons that expresses both D2-type dopamine receptors and adenosine A_{2A} receptors), located within the striatum
- the ventrolateral preoptic area (GABAergic neurons), located within the hypothalamus
- The lateral hypothalamus (melanin-concentrating hormone-releasing neurons), located within the hypothalamus

== Drugs ==
Some drugs influence sleep architecture by encroaching upon or prolonging deep sleep. Many drugs known to increase deep sleep in humans are of the GABAergic, dopaminergic, and anti-serotonergic classes.

Gamma-hydroxybutyrate is synthesized in the central nervous system from gamma-aminobutyric acid (GABA). Oral administration has been shown to enhance slow-wave sleep without suppressing REM sleep. In the United States, it is sold as a prescription drug under the brand name Xyrem. It has been shown to reduce cataplexy attacks and excessive daytime sleepiness in patients with narcolepsy.

The administration of the GABA_{a} agonist gabaxadol enhances both deep sleep and also positively impacts various indicators of insomnia.

Tiagabine, a selective GABA reuptake inhibitor, demonstrated improving sleep maintenance and significantly increasing SWS in healthy elderly subjects and adult patients with primary insomnia.

Levodopa is a drug commonly used to treat Parkinson's disease which acts to increases the brain's dopamine availability. Nocturnal single doses of levodopa increase slow-wave sleep by 10.6% in the elderly.

Antagonists of certain serotonergic receptors (namely 5-HT_{2A} and 5-HT_{2C}) have also been demonstrated to enhance slow-wave sleep, although they do not consistently bring about improvements in overall sleep duration or symptoms associated with insomnia. Trazodone, an atypical antidepressant, increases the duration of low-wave sleep; it is suspected that trazodone's antagonistic action at the 5-HT_{2A} receptor may contribute to this effect. A variety of drugs that antagonise the on 5-HT_{2A} and 5-HT_{2C} receptors exhibit SWS-enhancing effects in humans.

N-type calcium channel modulating gabapentinoids such as pregabalin are also known to increase slow-wave sleep in patients with fibromyalgia, restless leg syndrome, and partial seizures. Moreover, the results of a small double-blind randomized controlled trial suggests the enhancement of slow-wave sleep by pregabalin seems to carry on to healthy individuals as well.

== See also ==
- Delta sleep-inducing peptide
- Gaboxadol
- Large irregular activity
- Non-rapid eye movement sleep (NREM)
- Preconscious
- Sharp wave–ripple complexes
- Sleep and learning
- Subconscious
- Unconscious mind
- Unihemispheric slow-wave sleep
