= Louis Francois Bravais =

French physician

Louis Francois Bravais (1801-1843), was a French medical doctor at the Bicêtre Hospital who first described Jacksonian epilepsy in 1827.

== Selected publications ==
- "Recherches sur les symptômes et le traitement de l'épilepsie hémiplégique" (1827). Doctoral thesis
