= Ephialtes (disambiguation) =

Ephialtes was a fifth century BC Athenian statesman.

Ephialtes may also refer to:

- Ephialtes of Trachis, who betrayed the Greek army at Thermopylae to the Persians
- Ephialtes, in Greek mythology, one of the twin Aloadae, possibly the same as the Giant (below)
- Ephialtes, in Greek mythology, one of the Giants, possibly the same as the Aload (above)
- Ephialtes (illness), name given in the 18th century to an anxiety disorder
- Ephialtes (wasp), a genus of wasps in the family Ichneumonidae
