= DSIP =

The abbreviation DSIP can have different meanings:

- Delta sleep-inducing peptide
- Revolutionary Socialist Workers' Party (Turkey) Devrimci Sosyalist İşçi Partisi, (DSİP)
- Disability Service Improvement Program (Social Security Administration)
