= Night terror =

Sleep disorder causing feelings of panic or dread

- Other names: Sleep terror, pavor nocturnus
- Specialty: Psychiatry, sleep medicine, clinical psychology
- Symptoms: Feelings of panic or dread, sudden motor activity, thrashing, sweating, rapid breathing, increased heart rate
- Usual onset: Early childhood; symptoms tend to decrease with age
- Duration: 1 to 10 minutes
- Differential diagnosis: Epileptic seizure, nightmares

Night terror, also called sleep terror, is a sleep disorder causing feelings of panic or dread, typically occurring during the first hours of stage 3–4 non-rapid eye movement (NREM) sleep and lasting for 1 to 10 minutes. It can last longer, especially in children. Sleep terror is classified in the category of NREM-related parasomnias in the International Classification of Sleep Disorders. There are two other categories: REM-related parasomnias and other parasomnias. Parasomnias are qualified as undesirable physical events or experiences that occur during entry into sleep, during sleep, or during arousal from sleep.

Sleep terrors usually begin in childhood and usually decrease as age increases. Factors that may lead to sleep terrors are young age, sleep deprivation, medications, stress, fever, and intrinsic sleep disorders. The frequency and severity differ among individuals; the interval between episodes can be as long as weeks and as short as minutes or hours. As a result, any type of nocturnal attack or nightmare may be confused with and reported as a night terror.

Night terrors tend to happen during periods of arousal from delta sleep, or slow-wave sleep. Delta sleep occurs most often during the first half of a sleep cycle, which indicates that people with more delta-sleep activity are more prone to night terrors. However, they can also occur during daytime naps. Night terrors can often be mistaken for confusional arousal.

While nightmares (bad dreams during REM sleep that cause feelings of horror or fear) are relatively common during childhood, night terrors occur less frequently. The prevalence of sleep terrors in general is unknown. The number of small children who experience sleep terror episodes (distinct from sleep terror disorder, which is recurrent and causes distress or impairment) is estimated at 36.9% at 18 months of age and at 19.7% at 30 months. In adults, the prevalence is lower, at only 2.2%. Night terrors have been known since ancient times, although it was impossible to differentiate them from nightmares until rapid eye movement was studied.

== Signs and symptoms ==
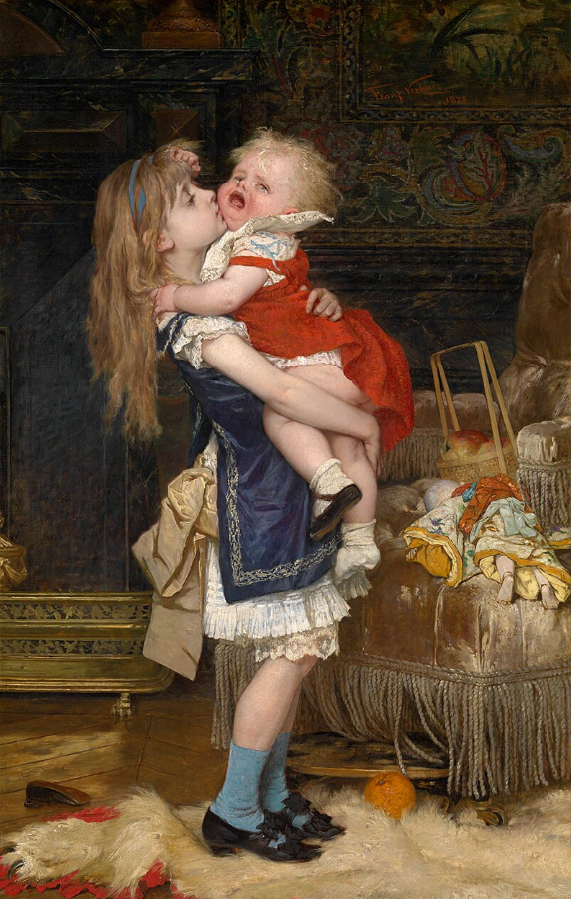
Frans Verhas, Inconsolable, 1878 (Royal Museum of Fine Arts Antwerp)

The universal feature of night terrors is inconsolability—very similar to that of a panic attack. During night terror bouts, sufferers are usually described as "bolting upright" with their eyes wide open and a having look of fear on their face. Individuals with night terrors will often yell, scream, or attempt to speak, but such speech is frequently incomprehensible. Furthermore, they usually sweat, exhibit rapid breathing, and have a rapid heart rate (i.e., autonomic signs). In some cases, individuals are likely to have even more elaborate motor activity, such as a thrashing of limbs—which may include punching, swinging, or fleeing motions. There is a sense that the individuals are trying to protect themselves and/or escape from a possible threat of bodily injury. Although sufferers may seem awake during a night terror, they will appear confused, inconsolable, and/or unresponsive to attempts to communicate with them and may not recognize others familiar to them. Occasionally, when a person with a night terror is awakened, they will lash out at the one awakening them, which can be dangerous to that individual. Most individuals who experience terrors do not remember the incident the next day, although brief dream images or hallucinations may occur and be recalled. Sleepwalking is also common during night terror bouts, as sleepwalking and night terrors manifest the same parasomnia. Both children and adults may display behaviour indicative of attempting to escape a terrifying event; some may thrash about or get out of bed and begin walking or running around aimlessly while inconsolable, increasing the risk of accidental injury. The risk of injury to others may be exacerbated by inadvertent provocation by nearby people, whose efforts to calm the individual may result in a physically violent response from the individual as they attempt to escape.

During polysomnography, individuals with night terrors are known to have very high voltages of electroencephalography (EEG) delta activity, an increase in muscle tone, and a doubled or faster heart rate. Brain activities during a typical episode show theta and alpha activity when monitored with an EEG. Episodes can include tachycardia. Night terrors are also associated with intense involuntary rapid and shallow breathing, profuse sweating, reddening of the skin, and pupil dilation. Abrupt but calmer arousal from non-rapid eye movement sleep, short of a full night terror episode, is also common.

In children with night terrors, there is no increased occurrence of psychiatric diagnoses. However, in adults with night terrors, there is a close association with psychopathology and mental disorders. There may be an increased occurrence of night terrors—particularly among those with post-traumatic stress disorder (PTSD) and generalized anxiety disorder (GAD) and anti-depressants used to treat these disorders. It is also likely that some personality disorders may occur in individuals with night terrors, such as dependent, schizoid, and borderline personality disorders. There have been some symptoms of depression and anxiety that have increased in individuals that have frequent night terrors. Low blood sugar is associated with both pediatric and adult night terrors. A study of adults with thalamic lesions of the brain and brainstem have been occasionally associated with night terrors. Night terrors are closely linked to sleepwalking and frontal lobe epilepsy.

=== Children ===
Night terrors typically occur in children between the ages of three and twelve years, with a peak onset in children aged three and a half years old. An estimated 1–6% of children experience night terrors. Children of both sexes and all ethnic backgrounds are all affected. In children younger than three and a half years old, the peak frequency of night terrors is at least one episode per week (up to 3–4 in rare cases). Among older children, the peak frequency of night terrors is one or two episodes per month. The children will most likely not recollect the episode the next day. Pediatric evaluation may be sought to exclude the possibility that seizure disorders or breathing problems cause night terrors. Most children will outgrow sleep terrors.

=== Adults ===
Night terrors in adults have been reported in all age ranges. Although the symptoms of night terrors in adolescents and adults are similar, the cause, prognosis, and treatment of symptoms are qualitatively different. These night terrors can occur each night if the individual does not eat a proper diet, get the appropriate amount or quality of sleep (e.g., sleep apnea), endure stressful events, and if they remain untreated. Adult night terrors are much less common and often respond to treatments to rectify causes of poor quality or quantity of sleep. Night terrors are classified as a mental and behavioral disorder in the ICD. The prevalence of other psychiatric symptoms among most patients has been identified, suggesting potential comorbidity. There is also some evidence of a link between night terrors and hypoglycemia.

When a night terror happens, it is typical for a person to wake up yelling and kicking and to be able to recognize what they are saying. The person may even run out of the house (more common among adults), which can then lead to violent actions. It has been found that some adults who have been on a long-term intrathecal clonidine therapy show side effects of night terrors, such as feelings of terror early in the sleep cycle. This is due to the possible alteration of cervical/brain clonidine concentration. In adults, night terrors can be symptomatic of neurological disease and can be further investigated through an MRI procedure.

== Causes ==
There is some evidence that a predisposition to night terrors and other parasomnias may be congenital. Individuals frequently report that past family members have had either episodes of sleep terrors or sleepwalking. In some studies, a tenfold increase in the prevalence of night terrors in first-degree biological relatives has been observed—however, the exact link to inheritance is not known. Familial aggregation has been found suggesting that there is an autosomal mode of inheritance. In addition, some laboratory findings suggest that sleep deprivation and having a fever can increase the likelihood of a night terror episode occurring. Other contributing factors include nocturnal asthma, gastroesophageal reflux, central nervous system medications, and a constricted nasal passage. Special consideration must be used when the subject has narcolepsy, as there may be a link. There have been no findings that show a cultural difference between manifestations of night terrors, though it is thought that the significance and cause of night terrors differ within cultures.

Also, older children and adults provide highly detailed and descriptive images associated with their sleep terrors compared to younger children, who either cannot recall or only vaguely remember. Sleep terrors in children are also more likely to occur in males than females; in adults, the ratio between sexes is equal. A longitudinal study examined twins, both identical and fraternal, and found that a significantly higher concordance rate of night terror was found in identical twins than in fraternal.

Adults who have experienced sexual abuse are more likely to receive a diagnosis of sleep disorders, including night terrors.

== Diagnosis ==
The DSM-5 diagnostic criteria for sleep terror disorder requires:

- Recurrent periods where the individual abruptly but not completely wakes from sleep, usually occurring during the first third major period of sleep.
- The individual experiences intense fear with a panicky scream at the beginning and symptoms of autonomic arousal, such as increased heart rate, heavy breathing, and increased perspiration. The individual cannot be soothed or comforted during the episode.
- The individual is unable or almost unable to remember images of the dream (only a single visual scene for example).
- The episode is completely forgotten.
- The occurrence of the sleep terror episode causes clinically significant distress or impairment in the individual's functioning.
- The disturbance is not due to the effects of a substance, general medical condition or medication.
- Coexisting mental or medical disorders do not explain the episodes of sleep terrors.

=== Differential diagnosis ===
Night terrors are distinct from nightmares. Nightmares almost never involve vocalization or agitation, and if there are any, they are less intense in comparison to night terrors. In addition, nightmares appear ordinarily during REM sleep in contrast to night terrors, which occur in NREM sleep. Finally, individuals with nightmares can wake up completely and easily and have clear and detailed memories of their dreams.

A distinction between night terrors and epileptic seizure, which can happen during the night or day, is required. An EEG with anomalies can be suggestive of an epileptic seizure rather than a night terror.

== Assessment ==
The assessment of sleep terrors is similar to the assessment of other parasomnias and must include:

- When the episode occurs during the sleep period
- Age of onset
- How often these episodes occur (frequency) and how long they last for (duration)
- Description of the episode, including behavior, emotions, and thoughts during and after the event
- How responsive the patient is to external stimuli during the episode
- How conscious or aware the patient is, when awakened from an episode
- If the episode is remembered afterwards
- The triggers or precipitating factors
- Sleep–wake pattern and sleep environment
- Daytime sleepiness
- Other sleep disorders that might be present
- Family history for NREM parasomnias and other sleep disorders
- Medical, psychiatric, and neurological history
- Medication and substance use history

Additionally, a home video might be helpful for a proper diagnosis. A polysomnography sleep study in the sleep laboratory is recommended for ruling out other disorders, however, sleep terrors occur less frequently in the sleep laboratory than at home and a polysomnography can therefore be unsuccessful at recording the sleep terror episode.

== Treatment ==
In most children, night terrors eventually subside and do not need to be treated. It may be helpful to reassure the child and their family that they will outgrow this disorder.

The duration of one episode is mostly brief but it may last longer if parents try to wake up the child. Awakening the child may make their agitation stronger. For all these reasons, it is important to let the sleep terror episode fade away and to just be vigilant in order for them not to fall to the ground.

Considering an episode could be violent, it may be advisable to secure the environment in which the child sleeps. Windows should be closed and potentially dangerous items should be removed from the bedroom, and additionally, alarms can be installed and the child placed in a downstairs bedroom.

There is some evidence to suggest that night terrors can result from lack of sleep or poor sleeping habits. In these cases, it can be helpful to improve the amount and quality of sleep the child is getting, including good sleep hygiene. Excessive stress or conflicts in a child's life can also impact on their sleep, so strategies to cope with stress combined with psychotherapy can decrease the frequency of the episodes. A polysomnography can be recommended if the child continues to have significant night terror episodes, while hypnosis can help sleepers become less sensitive to their sleep terrors.

One technique is to wake up just before the sleep terrors begin. When they appear regularly, this method can prevent their appearance.

Psychotherapy or counseling can be helpful in some cases.

Failing these methods, benzodiazepines (such as diazepam) or tricyclic antidepressants may be used; however, medication is only recommended in extreme cases. Widening the nasal airway by surgical removal of the adenoid was previously considered and demonstrated to be effective; however, invasive treatments are now generally avoided.

== Research ==
A small study of paroxetine found some benefit.

Another small trial found benefit with L-5-hydroxytryptophan (L-5-HTP).

== See also ==
- Ephialtes (illness)
- Horror and terror
- Sleep paralysis
- Night hag
