= Delta-sleep-inducing peptide =

Neuropeptide

Identifiers
- Symbol: DSIP
- UniProt: P01158
Search for
- Structures: Swiss-model
- Domains: InterPro

Delta-sleep-inducing peptide (Emideltide, DSIP) is a neuropeptide that when infused into the mesodiencephalic ventricle of recipient rabbits induces spindle and delta EEG activity and reduced motor activities.

Its amino acid sequence is Trp-Ala-Gly-Gly-Asp-Ala-Ser-Gly-Glu (WAGGDASGE). The gene has yet to be found in rabbits, along with any receptors or precursor peptides. However, searches through BLAST have found that it aligns with a hypothetical Amycolatopsis coloradensis protein. This could indicate that DSIP has a bacterial origin.

== Discovery ==
Delta-sleep-inducing peptide was first discovered in 1974 by the Swiss Schoenenberger-Monnier group who isolated it from the cerebral venous blood of rabbits in an induced state of sleep. It was primarily believed to be involved in sleep regulation due to its apparent ability to induce slow-wave sleep in rabbits, but studies on the subject have been contradictory.

DSIP-like material has been found in human breast milk.

== Structure and interactions ==
DSIP is an amphiphilic peptide of molecular weight 850 daltons with the amino acid motif:
N-Trp-Ala-Gly-Gly-Asp-Ala-Ser-Gly-Glu-C

It has been found in both free and bound forms in the hypothalamus, limbic system and pituitary as well as various peripheral organs, tissues and body fluids. In the pituitary it co-localises with many peptide and non-peptide mediators such as corticotropin-like intermediate peptide (CLIP), adrenocorticotrophic hormone (ACTH), melanocyte-stimulating hormone (MSH), thyroid-stimulating hormone (TSH) and melanin concentrating hormone (MCH). It is abundant in the gut secretory cells and in the pancreas where it co-localises with glucagon.

In the brain its action may be mediated by NMDA receptors. In another study delta-sleep-inducing peptide stimulated acetyltransferase activity through α_{1} receptors in rats. It is unknown where DSIP is synthesized.

In vitro it has been found to have a low molecular stability with a half life of only 15 minutes due to the action of a specific aminopeptidase-like enzyme. It has been suggested that in the body it complexes with carrier proteins to prevent degradation, or exists as a component of a large precursor molecule, but as yet no structure or gene has been found for this precursor.

Evidence supports the current belief that it is regulated by glucocorticoids.

Gimble et al. suggest that DSIP interacts with components of the MAPK cascade and is homologous to glucocorticoid-induced leucine zipper (GILZ). GILZ can be induced by Dexamethasone. It prevents Raf-1 activation, which inhibits phosphorylation and activation of ERK.

== Function ==
Many roles for DSIP have been suggested following research carried out using peptide analogues with a greater molecular stability and through measuring DSIP-like immunological (DSIP-LI) response by injecting DSIP antiserum and antibodies.

=== Roles in endocrine regulation ===
- Decreases basal corticotropin level and blocks its release.
- Stimulates release of luteinizing hormone (LH).
- Stimulates release of somatoliberin and somatotrophin secretion and inhibits somatostatin secretion.

=== Roles in physiological processes ===
- Can act as a stress limiting factor.
- May have a direct or indirect effect on body temperature and alleviating hypothermia.
- Can normalize blood pressure and myocardial contraction.
- It has been shown to enhance the efficiency of oxidative phosphorylation in rat mitochondria in vitro, suggesting it may have antioxidant effects.
- There is also conflicting evidence as to its involvement in sleep patterns. Some studies suggest a link between DSIP and slow-wave sleep (SWS) promotion and suppression of rapid eye movement sleep (REM), while some studies show no correlation. Stronger effects on sleep have been noted for the synthesized analogues of DSIP.
- It may affect human lens epithelial cell function via the MAPK pathway, which is involved in cell proliferation, differentiation, motility, survival, and apoptosis.

== Roles in disease and medicine ==
- It has been found to have anticarcinogenic properties. In a study on mice, injecting a preparation of DSIP over the mice's lifetime decreased total spontaneous tumor incidence 2.6-fold.
- The same study found it to also have geroprotective effects: it slowed down the age-related switching-off of oestrous function; it decreased by 22.6% the frequency of chromosome aberrations in bone marrow cells and it increased by 24.1% maximum life span in comparison with the control group.
- Levels of DSIP may be significant in patients diagnosed with major depressive disorder (MDD). In several studies, levels of DSIP in the plasma and cerebrospinal fluid are significantly deviated from the norm in patients with MDD, though there are contradictions as to whether levels are higher or lower than healthy control patients.
- Studies have demonstrated a direct link between GILZ expression (homologous to DSIP) and adipogenesis which has links to obesity and metabolic syndrome.
- In studies on rats with metaphit-induced epilepsy DSIP acted as an anticonvulsant, significantly decreasing the incidence and duration of fits suggesting DSIP as a potential treatment for epilepsy.
- DSIP has been found to have an analgesic effect. In studies on mice it was found to have a potent antinociceptive effect when administered intracerebroventricularly or intracisternally (see: Route of administration).
- Due to its possible effects on sleep and nociception, trials have been carried out to determine whether DSIP can be used as an anaesthetic. One such study found that administration of DSIP to humans as an adjunct to isoflurane anaesthesia actually increased the heart rate and reduced the depth of anaesthesia instead of deepening it as expected.
- Low plasma concentrations of DSIP have been found in patients with Cushing's syndrome.
- In Alzheimer's patients levels of DSIP have been found to be slightly elevated, though this is unlikely to be causal.
- A preparation of DSIP, Deltaran, has been used to correct central nervous system function in children after antiblastic therapy. Ten children aged 3–16 years were given a ten-day course of Deltaran and their bioelectric activity recorded. It was found that the chemotherapy-induced impairment in the bioelectrical activity of 9 out of the 10 children was reduced by administration of DSIP.
- DSIP can act antagonistically on opiate receptors to significantly inhibit the development of opioid and alcohol dependence and is currently being used in clinical trials to treat withdrawal syndrome. In one such trial it was reported that in 97% of opiate-dependent and 87% of alcohol-dependent patients the symptoms were alleviated by DSIP administration.
- In some studies administration of DSIP has alleviated narcolepsy and normalized disturbed sleeping patterns.

Safety and possible side-effects of long-term DSIP use haven't been established in clinical research studies.
