= Parafacial zone =

Details
- Part of: Brainstem (Medulla oblongata)

Identifiers
- Acronym: PZ

The parafacial zone (PZ) is a brain structure located in the brainstem within the medulla oblongata believed to be heavily responsible for non-rapid eye movement (non-REM) sleep regulation, specifically for inducing slow-wave sleep.

It is one of several GABAergic sleep-promoting nuclei in the brain, which also include the ventrolateral preoptic area of the hypothalamus, the nucleus accumbens core (specifically, the medium spiny neurons of the D2-type which co-express adenosine A_{2A} receptors), and a GABAergic nucleus in the lateral hypothalamus which co-releases melanin-concentrating hormone.

== Function and location ==
The parafacial zone promotes slow-wave sleep by inhibiting the glutamatergic parabrachial nucleus (a component of the ascending reticular activating system that mediates wakefulness and arousal) via the release of the inhibitory neurotransmitter GABA onto those neurons.

Optogenetic activation of GABAergic PZ neurons induces cortical slow-wave activity and slow-wave sleep in awake animals. In cases of genetic disruption of GABAergic transmizzion from PZ in mice, the mice were observed to go through periods of significantly longer, sustained wakefulness. PZ neurons are also believed to be sleep active, as they express c-Fos after sleep but not after wakefulness.

The parafacial is located within the medulla oblongata, lateral and dorsal to the facial nerve. It overlaps with the alpha part of the parvocellular reticular formation (PCRt), which is thought to govern states of consciousness as well as have some control over sleep-wake sensory signals and mechanisms. However, PZ and PCRt activity are believed to be of separate nature.

== Inputs ==
The parafacial zone receives inputs mainly from three areas: the hypothalamus, the midbrain, and the pons and medulla.

From the hypothalamus, the PZ receives inputs from the hypothalamic area, zona incerta, and the parasubthalamic nucleus; while the zona incerta and parasubthalamic nucleus functions remain largely unknown, several of their functions have been proposed to deal with action selection and limbic-motor integration.

From the midbrain, the PZ receives input from the substantia nigra, pars reticulata, and deep mesencephalic nucleus. These brain structures are believed to deal heavily with movement, as well as reward and unconscious reflex; additionally, the par reticulata especially has been documented to project nearly all GABAergic inhibitory neurons. And from the pons and medulla, the PZ receives input from the intermediate reticular nucleus and medial vestibular nucleus (parvocellular), areas that are thought to be involved in expiration and respiratory rhythm generation.

- From the hypothalamus
  - Hypothalamic area
  - Zona incerta
  - Parasubthalamic nucleus
  - Substantia nigra
- From the midbrain
  - Substantia nigra
  - Pars reticular
  - Mesenphalic nucleus

== Outputs ==
PZ neurons project to the medial parabrachial nucleus, a wake promoting neuron cluster that is part of the ascending reticular activating system.

Thirty-four various nuclei also share strong reciprocal projections with PZ GABAergic neurons, including various nuclei of the stria terminalis, the lateral hypothalamic area, the substantia nigra, the zona incerta, and the central amygdaloid nucleus. These strong reciprocal projections suggest feedback control and the ability to regulate specific functions.

- Parabrachial nucleus (part of the ascending reticular activating system)
- Stria terminalis
- Lateral hypothalamic area
- Substantia Nigra
- Zona Incerta
- Central Amygdaloid Nucleus
