= Sleep spindle =

EEG waveform that occurs during sleep

A fictional EEG showing a sleep spindle and K-complex in stage 2 sleep.

Sleep spindles are bursts of neural oscillatory activity that are generated by interplay of the thalamic reticular nucleus (TRN) and other thalamic nuclei during stage 2 NREM sleep in a frequency range of ~11 to 16 Hz (usually 12–14 Hz) with a duration of 0.5 seconds or greater (usually 0.5–1.5 seconds). After generation as an interaction of the TRN neurons and thalamocortical cells, spindles are sustained and relayed to the cortex by thalamo-thalamic and thalamo-cortical feedback loops regulated by both GABAergic and NMDA-receptor mediated glutamatergic neurotransmission. Sleep spindles have been reported (at face value) for all tested mammalian species. Considering animals in which sleep-spindles were studied extensively (and thus excluding results mislead by pseudo-spindles), they appear to have a conserved (across species) main frequency of roughly 9–16 Hz. Only in humans, rats and dogs is a difference in the intrinsic frequency of frontal and posterior spindles confirmed, however (spindles recorded over the posterior part of the scalp are of higher frequency, on average above 13 Hz).

Research supports that spindles (sometimes referred to as "sigma bands" or "sigma waves") play an essential role in both sensory processing and long term memory consolidation. Until recently, it was believed that each sleep spindle oscillation peaked at the same time throughout the neocortex. It was determined that oscillations sweep in circular patterns around the neocortex, peaking in one area, and then a few milliseconds later in an adjacent area. It has been suggested that this spindle organization allows for neurons to communicate across cortices. The time scale at which the waves travel is the same speed it takes for neurons to communicate with each other. Doubts, however, remain whether a link exists between sleep spindles and memory with a recent meta-review of 53 studies concluding that "there is no relationship between sleep spindles and memory, and thus it is unlikely that sleep spindles are indeed generally implicated in learning and plasticity".

Although the function of sleep spindles is unclear, it is believed that they actively participate in the consolidation of overnight declarative memory through the reconsolidation process. The density of spindles has been shown to increase after extensive learning of declarative memory tasks and the degree of increase in stage 2 spindle activity correlates with memory performance.

Among other functions, spindles facilitate somatosensory development, thalamocortical sensory gating, synaptic plasticity, and offline memory consolidation. Sleep spindles closely modulate interactions between the brain and its external environment; they essentially moderate responsiveness to sensory stimuli during sleep. Recent research has revealed that spindles distort the transmission of auditory information to the cortex; spindles isolate the brain from external disturbances during sleep. Another study found that re-exposure to olfactory cues during sleep initiate reactivation, an essential part of long term memory consolidation that improves later recall performance. Spindles generated in the thalamus have been shown to aid sleeping in the presence of disruptive external sounds. A correlation has been found between the amount of brainwave activity in the thalamus and a sleeper's ability to maintain tranquility. Spindles play an essential role in both sensory processing and long term memory consolidation because they are generated in the TRN.

During sleep, these spindles are seen in the brain as a burst of activity immediately following muscle twitching. Researchers think the brain, particularly in the young, is learning about what nerves control what specific muscles when asleep.

Sleep spindle activity has furthermore been found to be associated with the integration of new information into existing knowledge as well as directed remembering and forgetting (fast sleep spindles).

During NREM sleep, the brain waves produced by people with schizophrenia lack the normal pattern of slow and fast spindles. Loss of sleep spindles are also a feature of familial fatal insomnia, a prion disease. Changes in spindle density are observed in disorders. There are some studies that show a decrease in sleep spindles in autistic children. Also some studies suggest a lack of sleep spindles in epilepsy.

Research is currently underway to develop a web-based automatic sleep spindle detection system by using machine learning techniques. The results of the present study show that the automatic sleep spindle detection system has great potential in practical application.

== Evolution ==
No sleep spindles have been observed in reptiles and birds so far. In most mammals sleep spindles were described at face value, but the existence of pseudo-spindles invites uncertainty around these observations. Spindle-like oscillations, that show additional analogies (e.g. apparent involvement in learning or thalamic dependence) are currently only known from humans, rats, mice, cats, and dogs. In these species spindles invariantly oscillate between 9 and 16 Hz, with minor variations (e.g. 7–14 Hz in the cat). Clearly distinct frontal and posterior sleep spindles (i.e. "slow" and "fast") were only confirmed outside humans in rats and dogs.

== Sex differences ==
Sleep spindles play a crucial role in declarative memory consolidation and both sex and menstruation affect sleep and online learning periods. Studies have shown that the influence of sleep spindles during the declarative memory process may be affected by modulatory menstrual cycle effects in females.

Humanlike sex differences in sleep spindle activity and sleep-dependent learning were observed in dogs. A direct link to specific sexual hormones could not be established, but the effects were stronger in intact animals.

Females tend to have 0.16 more sleep spindles per minute than males ( i.e. roughly 9–10 more over an hour's time). A female advantage has been found for episodic, emotional, and spatial memories as well as recognition of odours, faces, and pictures. These differences are believed to be due to hormonal influence, especially that of estrogen. The female sex hormone estrogen primarily influences sexual maturation and reproduction, but has also been found to facilitate other brain functions, including cognition and memory. On verbal tasks where women scored higher than men, women scored higher during the mid-luteal phase, when females have higher estrogen levels, when compared to the menstrual phase. A recent study found that local brain estrogen production within cognitive circuits may be important for the acquisition and consolidation of memories. Recent experiments concerning the relationship between estrogen and the process of offline memory consolidation have also focused on sleep spindles. Genzel and colleagues determined that there was a menstrual effect on declarative and motor performance, meaning that females in the mid-luteal phase (high estrogen) performed higher than the other female participants. Females in the luteal phase were also the only participants to experience an increase in spindles after learning, which led to the conclusion that the effect of the menstrual cycle may be mediated by spindles and female hormones.
