= Ephialtes (illness) =

Anxiety disorder

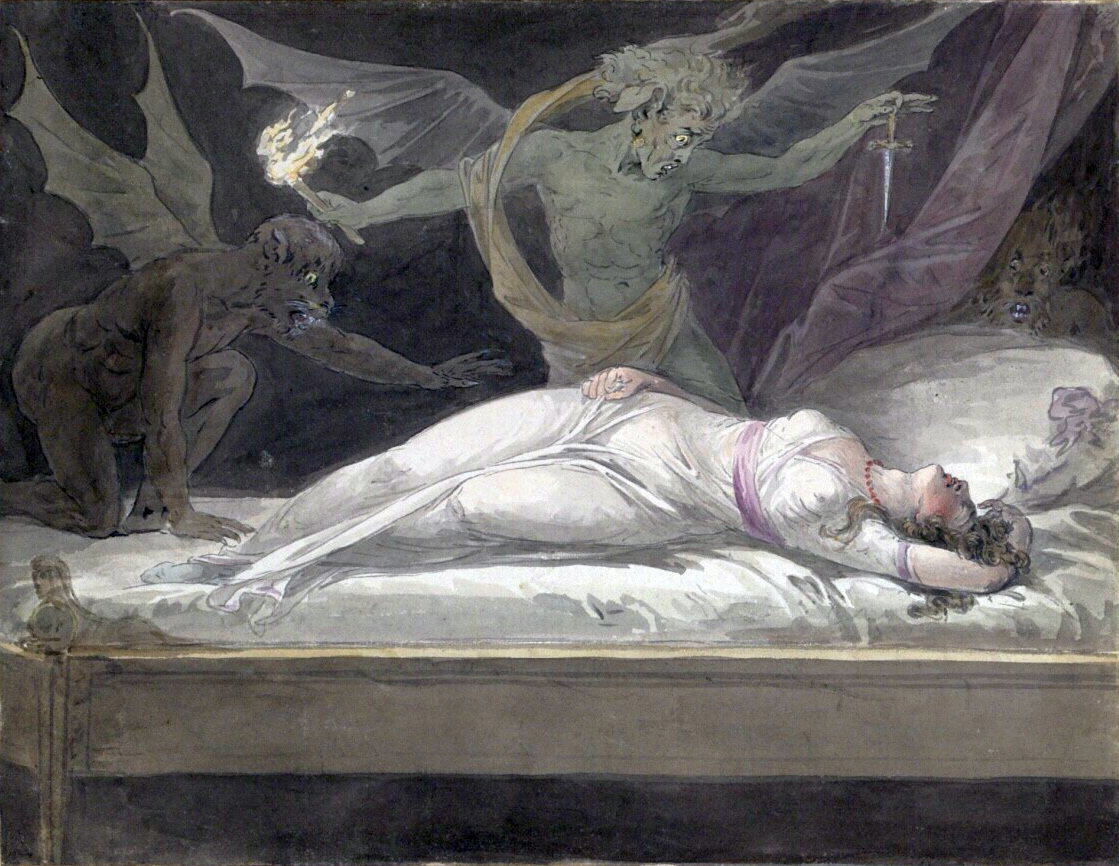
Incubo, 1870

Ephialtes is an anxiety disorder identified as such by John Bond in 1753, along with other authors of those times, in his treatise "An Essay on the Incubus, or Nightmare". The famous Greek physician Galen in the 2nd century AD had already named nightmares "Ephialtes". Throughout history, sleep paralysis and the similar term nightmare have been widely accompanied by mythological creatures with paranormal powers (e.g., Ephialtes of the Greeks and Incubus of the Romans).

The idea of an incubus as a causative factor in nightmares stemmed from the belief that some spirit or ghostly person crept in during the night and lay upon the sleeper, so as to constrict the chest and breathing—leading to a sense of suffocation, side by side with a terrifying dream of being either crushed or (in the case of a woman) sexually violated by the (male) incubus or ephialtes. Sleepers thus set upon feel they are about to die—but as Bond (who was himself prone to nightmares) stated: "As soon as they shake off that vast oppression, they are affected with a strong palpitation, great anxiety, languour, and uneasiness – which symptoms gradually abate, and are succeeded by the pleasing reflection of having escaped such imminent danger" (p. 3).

== See also ==
- Night hag
- Sleep paralysis

== Bibliography ==
- D. J. Stein, E. Hollander, B. O. Rothbaum, Textbook of Anxiety Disorders, American Psychiatric Pub, 2009, p. 6.
