= Ventrolateral preoptic nucleus =

Nucleus of the anterior hypothalamus

- The VLPO is located at the anterior of the hypothalamus. It is also called the intermediate nucleus of the preoptic area

Details
- Part of: Preoptic nucleus

Identifiers
- Acronym: VLPO or IPA
- NeuroNames: 3122

The ventrolateral preoptic nucleus (VLPO), also known as the intermediate nucleus of the preoptic area (IPA), is a small cluster of neurons situated in the anterior hypothalamus, sitting just above and to the side of the optic chiasm in the brain of humans and other animals. The brain's sleep-promoting nuclei (e.g., the VLPO, parafacial zone, nucleus accumbens core, and lateral hypothalamic MCH neurons), together with the ascending arousal system which includes components in the brainstem, hypothalamus and basal forebrain, are the interconnected neural systems which control states of arousal, sleep, and transitions between these two states. The VLPO is active during sleep, particularly during non-rapid eye movement sleep (NREM sleep), and releases inhibitory neurotransmitters, mainly GABA and galanin, which inhibit neurons of the ascending arousal system that are involved in wakefulness and arousal. The VLPO is in turn innervated by neurons from several components of the ascending arousal system. The VLPO is activated by the endogenous sleep-promoting substances adenosine and prostaglandin D2. The VLPO is inhibited during wakefulness by the arousal-inducing neurotransmitters norepinephrine and acetylcholine. The role of the VLPO in sleep and wakefulness, and its association with sleep disorders – particularly insomnia and narcolepsy – is a growing area of neuroscience research.

== Structure ==
At least 80% of neurons in the VLPO that project to the ascending arousal system are GABAergic (neurons that produce GABA). In vitro studies in rats have shown that many neurons in the VLPO that are inhibited by norepinephrine or acetylcholine are multipolar triangular shaped cells with low threshold spikes. These triangular multipolar neurons exist in two sub-populations in the VLPO:

- Type 1 – inhibited by serotonin.
- Type 2 – excited by serotonin and adenosine.

As adenosine accumulates during wakefulness it is likely that type 2 cells play a role in sleep induction.

The remaining third of neurons in the VLPO are excited by norepinephrine. Their role is unclear.

In mice, all galaninergic neurons of the VLPO are inhibited by norepinephrine and excited by adenosine, although serotonin still differentiates Type 1 and Type 2 neurons.

== Function ==
=== Sleep/wakefulness ===
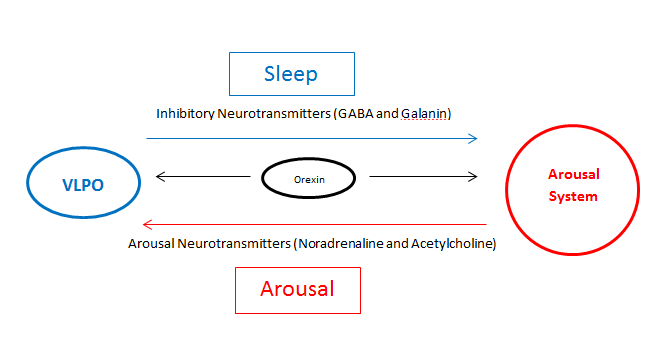
Schematic representation of the Flip-Flop Switch Hypothesis

In the early 20th century, Constantin von Economo noted that humans who had encephalitis with lesions in the anterior hypothalamus had insomnia, and proposed a sleep-promoting influence from that area. Animal studies in the mid-20th century in rats and cats confirmed that very large lesions in the preoptic area and basal forebrain resulted in insomnia but did not identify the cell group that was responsible. In 1996, Sherin and colleagues reported the presence of a cell group in the VLPO that expresses cFos (a protein often found in neurons that have recently been active) during sleep, and that these neurons contain the inhibitory neurotransmitters GABA and galanin. These same neurons receive inputs from the median preoptic nucleus (MnPO) and were found to innervate components of the ascending arousal system, including the tuberomammillary nucleus (TMN) and other components of the lateral hypothalamus; the raphe nuclei; the locus coeruleus (LC); the pedunculopontine (PPT) and laterodorsal tegmental nuclei (LDT); and the parabrachial nucleus (PB). More recent studies using opto- or chemogenetic activation of VLPO neurons have confirmed that they promote sleep.

The sleep-promoting effects of the VLPO neurons is thought to be due to release of GABA and possibly galanin that suppresses firing of arousal system neurons. As the VLPO is also inhibited by neurotransmitters released by components of the arousal systems, such as acetylcholine and norepinephrine, a current theory has proposed that the VLPO and the arousal system form a "flip-flop" circuit. This term from electrical engineering denotes a circuit in which mutual inhibition means that each component of the circuit, as it turns on, turns the other off, resulting in rapid transitions from one state (wake or sleep) to the other, with minimal time in transition states. This theory has been used to create mathematical models that explain much of the wake-sleep behavior in animals, including in pathological states and responses to drugs. Orexin neurons in the posterior lateral hypothalamus potentiate neurons in the ascending arousal system and help stabilize the brain in the waking state (and consolidated wakefulness, which builds up homeostatic sleep drive, helps stabilize the brain during later sleep). The loss of orexin neurons in the disorder narcolepsy destabilizes the wake-sleep switch, resulting in overwhelming sleep episodes during the waking day, as well as more frequent awakenings from sleep at night.

=== Circadian rhythm ===
There is a strong circadian rhythm of sleep in mammals. The "master clock" for circadian rhythms in mammals is the suprachiasmatic nucleus (SCN). The SCN has little if any projection directly to the VLPO neurons. Instead, they project strongly to the adjacent subparaventricular zone, which in turn contains inhibitory GABAergic neurons that innervate the dorsomedial nucleus of the hypothalamus. Lesions of the dorsomedial nucleus almost completely eliminate the circadian rhythm of sleep. GABAergic neurons in the dorsomedial nucleus innervate the VLPO, and glutamatergic neurons innervate the lateral hypothalamus, suggesting that the dorsomedial nucleus mainly promotes wakefulness during the active period (daytime for humans).

== Clinical significance ==
=== Insomnia ===
Elderly human patients with more galanin neurons in their intermediate nucleus (the human equivalent of the VLPO galanin neurons in rodents) have better, more continuous sleep. A reduced number of VLPO neurons is associated with more fragmented sleep (more awakenings throughout the night).

Lesions in the VLPO in rats results in 50-60% decrease in NREM sleep time and prolonged insomnia. More recent research suggests that stress-induced insomnia could be due to an imbalance of input to arousal system and VLPO neurons.

=== Sedative/hypnotic drugs ===
Many sedative/hypnotic drugs act by binding to and potentiating GABA-A receptors. These include older drugs such as ethanol, chloral hydrate and barbiturates, as well as newer benzodiazepines and "non-benzodiazepine" drugs (such as zolpidem, which bind to the same receptor but have a different chemical configuration), and even anesthetics such as propofol and isoflurane. As the VLPO inputs to the arousal system use this same receptor, these drugs at low doses essentially act by potentiating the VLPO, producing a sleepy state. Animal studies show that VLPO neurons show cFos activation after sedative doses of these drugs, and that VLPO lesions produce resistance to their sedative effects. However, at high doses that produce a surgical plane of anesthesia, these drugs have much more widespread inhibitory effects, that do not depend upon the VLPO. Studies have shown that multiple sedative/hypnotic drugs that act by potentiating GABA-A receptors, including ethanol, chloral hydrate, propofol and gas anesthetics such as isoflurane, at sedative doses increase the activity of the VLPO neurons in mice. This finding suggests that at relatively low sedative doses, these medications may have a common mechanism of action, which includes potentiating the firing of VLPO neurons. High doses used in surgical anesthesia, however, reduce activity of neurons throughout the nervous system.
