= Scratch reflex =

Response to activation of sensory neurons

A shaggy dog demonstrates a scratch reflex. When she is scratched beneath her front leg, her back leg moves vigorously.

The scratch reflex is an automatic response to the activation of sensory neurons located on the surface of the body. Sensory neurons can be activated via stimulation, such as a parasite on the body, but can also be activated by responding to a chemical stimulus that produces an itching sensation. During a scratch reflex, a limb reaches toward and rubs against the site on the body surface that has been stimulated. The scratch reflex has been extensively studied to understand the functioning of neural networks in vertebrates. Despite decades of research, key aspects of the scratch reflex are still unknown, such as the neural mechanisms by which the reflex is terminated.

== Model systems and tools ==
=== Animal models and preparations ===
A brown bear scratching its body against a downed tree

Thomson's gazelle scratching head with rear foot

A number of animal models have been used to study, understand and characterize the scratch reflex. These models include the turtle, cat, frog, dog, and a variety of other vertebrates. In these studies, researchers made use of spinal preparations, which involve a complete transection of the animal's spinal cord prior to experimentation. Such preparations are used because the scratch reflex can be elicited and produced without the involvement of supraspinal structures. Researchers focused predominantly on investigating spinal cord neural circuitry responsible for the generation of the scratch reflex, limiting the system of study.

In studies of spinal preparations, researchers have experimented with using preparations both with and without movement-related sensory inputs. In preparations with movement-related sensory inputs, the muscles and the motor neuron outputs to muscles are left intact, allowing sensory feedback from the moving limb. In preparations without movement-related sensory input, one of three strategies is used:

1. the axons of sensory neurons are cut by dorsal root transection; or
2. neuromuscular blockers are used to prevent contractions of muscles in response to motor neuron activity; or
3. the spinal cord is isolated in a bath of physiological saline

=== Recording techniques ===
Electromyographic (EMG) and electroneurographic (ENG) techniques are used to monitor and record from animals during experiments. EMG recordings are used to record electrical activity directly from muscles. ENG recordings are used to record electrical activity from motor neurons and spinal cord neurons. These techniques have enabled researchers to understand the neural circuitry of the scratch reflex on a single-cell level.

== Characteristics ==
=== General ===
The scratch reflex is generally a rhythmic response. Results from animal studies have indicated that spinal neural networks known as central pattern generators (CPGs) are responsible for the generation and maintenance of the scratch reflex. One feature of the scratch reflex is that supraspinal structures are not necessary for the generation of the reflex. The scratch response is programmed into the spinal cord and can be produced in spinal animals.

Another feature of the scratch reflex is that the spinal CPGs that generate and maintain the reflex is capable of producing the reflex in the absence of movement-related sensory feedback. This discovery was made while studying animals with silenced afferent neurons from the scratching limb, meaning no movement-related sensory feedback was available to the spinal circuits driving the scratch. These animals were capable of producing a functional scratch response, albeit diminished in accuracy. When afferent feedback is provided, the scratch response is more accurate in terms of accessing the stimulus site. Recordings indicate that feedback modulates the timing and intensity of scratching, in the form of phase and amplitude changes in nerve firing.

In studying the scratch reflex, researchers have named a number of regions on the surface of the body as they relate to the reflex. A pure form domain is a region on the surface of the body, that when stimulated, elicits only one form of the scratch reflex. A form is a movement-related strategy used by the animal to perform the scratch; for example, to scratch the upper back, humans are limited to one scratch form, involving the elbow raised above the shoulder to provide access to the upper back. In addition to pure-form domains, there also exist a number of transition zones, which can be successfully targeted by more than one form of the reflex, and which usually lie at the boundary of two pure-form domains.

Researchers have also developed terms to describe the scratch reflex movements themselves. A pure movement is one in which only one form of the scratch response is utilized to respond to the stimulus. A switch movement occurs in a transition zone and is characterized by the smooth switching between two different scratch forms in response to the stimulus. A hybrid movement is observed and occurs at transition zones as well, and is characterized by two rubs during each scratch cycle, where each rub is derived from one pure-form movement. Research on hybrid and switch movements at transition zones indicates that the CPGs responsible for scratch generation are modular and share interneurons. For this reason, in both the switch and hybrid movements, the path of the moving limb is smooth and uninterrupted.

Studies from EMG recordings have indicated that reciprocal inhibition between hip-related interneurons in the CPG for the scratch reflex is not necessary for the production and maintenance of the hip-flexor rhythm that is a key part of the scratch reflex. This research further supports the findings on the switch and hybrid movements, which suggest a modular organization of unit generator CPGs used in combination to achieve a task.

Another general aspect of the scratch response is that the response continues even after afferent input from the stimulated zone ceases. For a few seconds after the cessation of the scratch, the neural networks involved in the generation of the scratch reflex remain in a state of heightened sensitivity. During this period of increased excitability, stimuli normally too weak to trigger a scratch response are capable of eliciting a scratch response in a site-specific manner. That is, stimuli, too weak to elicit the scratch response when applied in a rested preparation, are capable of eliciting the scratch response during the period of increased excitability just following a scratch response. This excitability is due, in part, to the long-time constant of NMDA receptors. Research has also shown that voltage-gated calcium channels have a role in the increased excitability of spinal neurons.

=== Spinal ===
As described in the general characteristics above, the scratch reflex is programmed into the neural circuitry of the spinal cord. Initial experiments on the scratch reflex in dogs revealed that the spinal cord has circuits capable of summing inputs. This ability of the spinal cord was discovered when stimuli, on their own too weak to generate a response, was capable of eliciting a scratch response when applied in quick succession.

Additionally, studies involving successive spinal transections in a turtle model have identified that spinal CPGs are distributed throughout the spinal segments asymmetrically. Furthermore, the site specificity of the scratch response indicates that the spinal circuitry also has a built-in map of the body. This allows the spinal CPGs to generate a scratch response targeted to the site of the stimulus independent of supraspinal structures.

Research into form selection has revealed that form selection is also intrinsic to the spinal cord. More recent research suggests that form selection is accomplished using the summed activities of populations of broadly tuned interneurons shared by various unit CPGs. Additionally, intracellular recordings have illustrated that motor neurons receive at least two types of inputs from spinal CPGs. These inputs include inhibitory postsynaptic potentials (IPSPs) and excitatory postsynaptic potentials (EPSPs), meaning that scratch CPGs are responsible for both the activation and deactivation of muscles during the scratch response.

Very recent research suggests that the scratch reflex shares interneurons and CPGs with other locomotor tasks such as walking and swimming. The findings from these studies also suggests that mutual inhibition between networks may play a role in behavioral choice in the spinal cord. This finding is supported by earlier observations on the scratch reflex, which indicate that the scratch reflex was particularly difficult to induce in animals already involved in a different locomotive task, such as walking or swimming.

=== Supraspinal ===
While the scratch reflex can be produced without supraspinal structures, research indicates that neurons in the motor cortex play a role in the modulation of the scratch reflex as well. Stimulation of pyramidal tract neurons has been found to modulate the timing and intensity of scratch reflex. Furthermore, extensive research has identified the involvement of supraspinal structures in the modulation of the rhythmic elements of the scratch reflex. The current theory is that efference copies from CPGs travel to the cerebellum via spinocerebellar pathways. These signals then modulate the activity of the cerebellar cortex and nuclei, which in turn regulate descending tract neurons in the vestibulospinal, reticulospinal, and rubrospinal tracts. Presently, there is not much else known about the specifics of supraspinal control of the scratch reflex.

== Scratch reflex in dogs ==
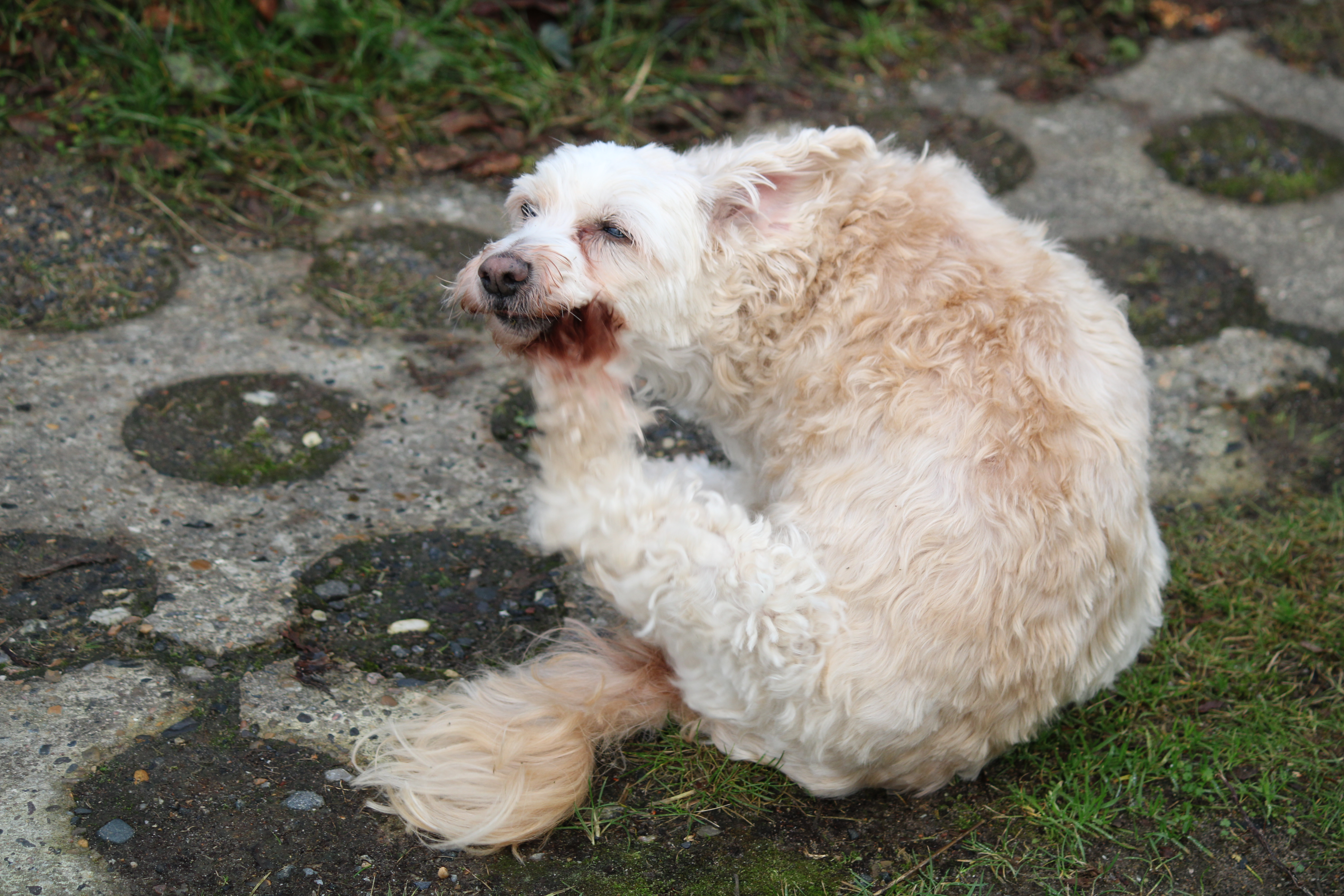
An adult female dog scratching itself near Frederikshavn, 2025

Most dogs will exhibit a scratch reflex when they are stimulated in the saddle region, which consists of the belly, sides, flanks, and back. These are the most common sites, but stimulation anywhere may be able to produce the reflex, such as the chest, ears, and even paws. Once stimulation of this area begins, the dog will begin to rhythmically "twitch" or "kick" their hind legs in an attempt to rid itself of the "irritant". Typically, only one of the hind legs will exhibit this reflex at a given time, however, it is possible for both legs to undergo the reflex at the same time. The intensity and rhythm of the reflex will vary depending on the intensity and speed of the stimulation.

The scratch reflex can commonly be triggered through various stimulations such as scratching, brushing, rubbing, or tapping a dog, although some techniques work better than others. For example, a majority of dogs will exhibit the reflex when scratched with fingernails, while only some with a stronger reflex might react to a lighter tapping.

Allergies and itchiness often play a role in the scratch reflex, with dogs who are already itchy before the additional stimulation often producing a stronger reflex than other dogs. It is common for dogs with flea infestations to have a strong reflex when stimulated at the base of the tail, due to the itchiness caused by the fleas.

== See also ==
- Biological neural network
- Central nervous system
- Central pattern generator
