= Dayuse.com =

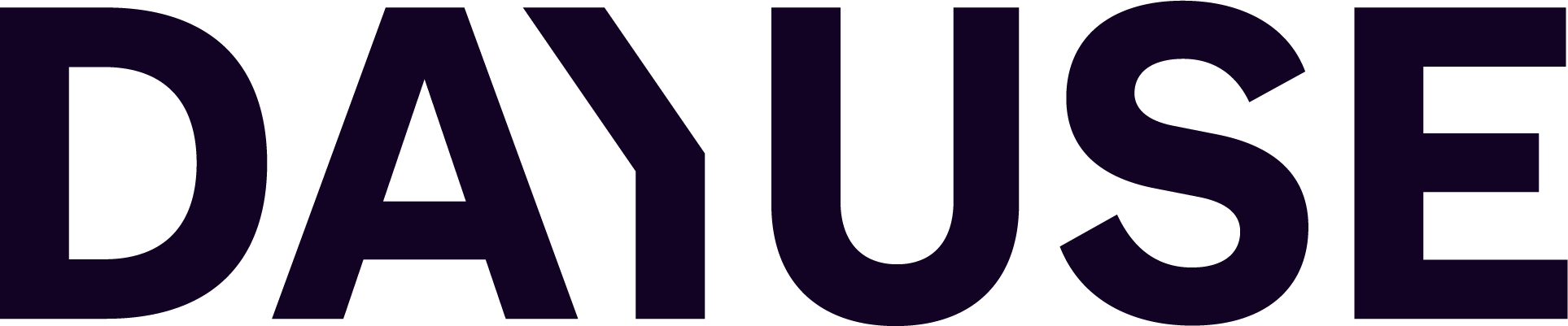
- Website type: Daytime Hotel Booking Service
- Available in: 14 languages
- Headquarters: Paris, France
- Owner: David Lebée (CEO)
- Registration: Yes
- Launched: 2010; 16 years ago
- Current status: Active

Dayuse.com is a Paris-based booking platform for microstays, with offices in Hong Kong, Montreal and New York. Created in 2010. The company facilitates the online and telephone booking of daytime booking rooms. The platform collaborates with a network of over 7000 across 25 countries, serving as an intermediary that connects customers with their chosen hotel accommodations.

In 2015, the daytime hotel booking platform Dayuse.com raised 15 million euros in a series A investment round. The investment round was led by venture capital firms Idinvest Partners and Partech Ventures, with the participation of business angels: Paul Dubrule (Co-founder of the Accor group), Charles Petruccelli (Former American Express Travel CEO), and Cédric Barbier (Creator of lesjeudis.com).

== History ==
Dayuse.com was founded in 2010 by David Lebée and Thibaud D’Agrèves, they both worked at Hotel Amour in Paris. The hotel is known for accommodating touring artists and musicians, who ask about renting a room for a few hours during daytime as a place to relax before a performance. Lebée and D’Agrèves recognised that there was a gap in the market.

== International development ==
- 2010: Launch of the site with a dozen hotels in Paris
- 2011: Launch of Dayuse.com in Belgium, Switzerland and Luxembourg
- 2011: Launch of a discount version: Dayuse-pascher.com
- 2012: Launch in the UK
- 2012: Launch of a mobile application
- 2013: Launch in the US
- 2014: Dayuse.com raises 1 million euros, obtained from Partech Ventures, Cédric Barbier and Christophe Chausson
- 2015: Opening of new offices in New York
- 2015: Dayuse.com raises 15 million euros obtained from Idinvest Partners and Partech Ventures
- 2016: Winner of the People's Choice Award for Best Innovation at Phocuswright, Los Angeles
- 2017: Opening of new offices in Hong Kong
- 2018: Launch of a new mobile application
- 2018: Launch of Dayuse Business, for business travelers
