= William Gordon Lennox =

American neurologist and epileptologist

William Gordon Lennox (18 July 1884 – 21 July 1960) was an American neurologist and epileptologist who was a pioneer in the use of electroencephalography (EEG) for the diagnosis and treatment of epilepsy. He graduated from Colorado College and Harvard Medical School.

== Biography ==
Lennox first became interested in epilepsy when working as medical missionary in China. At the Harvard Medical School, he worked alongside and published many papers with Stanley Cobb, Erna Gibbs and Frederic Gibbs. He was jointly awarded (with Frederic Gibbs) the Albert Lasker Award for Clinical Medical Research in 1951. He wrote, with his daughter Margaret, "Epilepsy and Related Disorders".

In 1937, Lennox described the situation regarding the medical treatment of epilepsy at the time:

In the US there are some 500,000 persons subject to epilepsy. This is approximately the same number as have diabetes or active tuberculosis. In Roman days a seizure in the forum caused its dissolution; now a seizure in a classroom means dismissal of the offending student. In the US we have only the extremes of care in the home, or in largely publicly supported institutions into which the dregs of patients have settled. From the practical point of view, patients with epilepsy are an unusually valuable group for human experimentation. They are numerous, and are available to the research staff of the general hospital; they can usually give intelligent co-operation; they are pathetically anxious to be experimented upon; they have abrupt and unmistakable changes from normal to abnormal states. Epilepsy comparatively speaking has been a neglected field. To the epileptic writhing on the road of medicine, the investigator has perhaps given a cup of cold water, but then has passed by to succour those with illnesses which seemed more likely to reward his efforts. From the humanitarian point of view, epileptics are peculiarly in need of help."

From 1935 to 1949, Lennox was president and from 1949 to 1953 honorary president of the International League Against Epilepsy (ILAE). From 1941 to 1948 he was – together with Hans Iacob Schou – co-editor, from 1948 to 1950 and again 1952 single editor of the journal Epilepsia of the ILAE. From 1936 to 1937 he served as first president of the American League Against Epilepsy, which later became the American Epilepsy Society (AES).

In 1951, he described a special epilepsy syndrome, later on named after him and the French neurologist and epileptologist Henri Gastaut Lennox–Gastaut syndrome.

Lennox was also involved with the eugenics movement. He gave a speech in 1938 to Harvard's Phi Beta Kappa, recommending euthanasia for "the congenitally mindless and for the incurable sick who wish to die". In the same year, he wrote "The principle of limiting certain races through limitation of off-spring might be applied internationally as well as intranationally." In 1943, Lennox joined the advisory council of the Euthanasia Society of America (later known as Partnership for Caring). In 1950, he wrote an article entitled "The Moral Issue", calling for the mercy killing of "children with undeveloped or misformed brains" as a way of opening up space in "our hopelessly clogged institutions."

He continued working into his 70s, only retiring from Harvard in 1958. He died two years later.

== Partial bibliography ==
- Lennox WG, Cobb S. Epilepsy (Medicine Monographs, Vol 14). Baltimore, Williams & Wilkins 1928
- The Health and Turnover of Missionaries (1933)
- Lennox WG. Science and Seizures: New Light on Epilepsy and Migraine. New York – London, Harper & Brothers 1941 (second edition 1949)
- Lennox WG, Lennox MA. Epilepsy and Related Disorders. Two Volumes. Boston – Toronto, Little, Brown and Company 1960
