= Christophe Bavière =

- Born: 5 March 1964 (age 62); Paris, France
- Education: ESLSCA Business School; University of Ottawa (MBA)
- Occupations: Business executive; Financier
- Employers: BNP Paribas; Caisse des Dépôts et Consignations; AGF-Allianz; Idinvest Partners; Eurazeo
- Title: CEO of Eurazeo
- Term: 2023–present
- Honors: Knight of the Legion of Honour (2020)

Christophe Bavière (born 5 March 1964 in Paris) is a French business executive specializing in private equity. Between 2001 and 2021, he served as the founding Chairman, CEO, and Executive Committee member of Idinvest Partners. From 2021 to early 2023, he was a Managing Partner and member of the Executive Board at Eurazeo. Since February 2023, he has held the position of Co-Chief Executive Officer of Eurazeo, alongside William Kadouch-Chassaing.

== Biography ==
Christophe Bavière is a graduate of ESLSCA Business School and holds an MBA from the University of Ottawa.

He began his career in 1987 in the fixed-income market at BNP Paribas as Head of Fixed-Income Sales, before joining Caisse des Dépôts as a trader. He subsequently joined the AGF-Allianz Group, serving as CIO of Allianz Private Partners and then CEO of Allianz Investors. In 2001, he joined Idinvest Partners (formerly AGF Private Equity) as Chairman of the Executive Board. That same year, he was also appointed Chairman of the Executive Board of AGF Private Equity.

Starting in 1997, he developed private equity at Idinvest Partners as a distinct asset class within diversified portfolios. He focused on startups such as Meetic, Deezer, and Sarenza, where Idinvest Partners was one of the first funds to invest. This tech-focused investment strategy led to several portfolio companies being listed on the Nasdaq, including Talend, Criteo, and Auris,, and attracted major groups such as EDF, Total, Air Liquide, and Lagardère. Alongside Benoist Grossmann, Christophe Bavière contributed to Idinvest Partners' international expansion.

In 2009, he became Head of Asset Management at Allianz France.

== Eurazeo ==
In 2017, the French investment firm Eurazeo announced its plan to acquire a 70% stake in Idinvest Partners. In 2018, Christophe Bavière and Benoist Grossmann officially announced the union between Idinvest and Eurazeo, with the goal of creating a major player in European private equity. In 2021, Eurazeo appointed Christophe Bavière to its Executive Board.

Since February 2023, Christophe Bavière has been Co-Chief Executive Officer of Eurazeo alongside William Kadouch-Chassaing, former Deputy CEO of Société Générale, following the establishment of a new Executive Board.

In November 2026, Christophe Bavière became the sole CEO of Eurazeo.

== Other activities ==
- He is Chairman of the Private Equity Technical Committee of the AFG (French Asset Management Association).
- He served two terms on the AMF's Consultative Commission.
- He is a member of the French Institute of Actuaries.
- He also served as Vice-President of AFIC (the French Association of Investors for Growth)

== Awards and honours ==
- 2006: Named "Private Equity Personality of the Year" by Les Échos
- 2020: Knight of the Legion of Honour.

== Publications ==
- "L'innovation, parent pauvre du déferlement de liquidités mondial” (“Innovation: The poor relation of the global liquidity surge”), La Revue d'économie financière (collective work), 2015
- "Tribulations Financières, au pays des entrepreneurs" [Financial Tribulations, in the Land of Entrepreneurs], Christophe Bavière, Benoist Grossmann, "Documents" collection, Paris, Cherche-Midi, 2015
