= Michael Saunders (disambiguation) =

Michael Saunders (born 1986) is a Canadian Major League Baseball center fielder.

Michael Saunders may also refer to:

- Michael Saunders (academic) (born 1944), American numerical analyst and computer scientist
- Michael Saunders (economist), Bank of England Monetary Policy Committee member
- Michael Graham Saunders (1920–1975), neurophysiologist
- Michael Saunders (lawyer) (1944–1996), British lawyer and public servant
- Mike Saunders (musician) (born 1952), rock critic and singer
- Mike Saunders (gridiron football) (born 1969), Canadian Football League running back
- Mike Saunders (footballer) (born 1972), Jamaican soccer player
- Mike Saunders (rugby union) (born 1959), American rugby union player
