= CFM =

CFM or cfm may refer to:

== Organizations ==
- Canadian Federation of Musicians
- Capital Fund Management, a French hedge fund
- CFM International, an American/French aircraft engine manufacturer
- CFM (radio station), broadcasting to parts of Cumbria and Scotland
- Christian Family Movement, an American movement of small faith groups
- Christian Federation of Malaysia, an ecumenical body
- Christian Fellowship Ministries, a church associated with Potter's House Christian Fellowship
- Compagnie française des métaux, a former non-ferrous metal manufacturer
- Convenient Food Mart, a chain of convenience stores in the US
- Cook Flying Machines, designer and maker of the CFM Shadow microlight aeroplane
- Crypton Future Media, a Japanese company

=== Railways ===
- Calea Ferată din Moldova, the Moldovan State Railway
- Caminhos de Ferro de Moçambique, the railway company of Mozambique
- Moçâmedes Railway or Caminho-de-Ferro de Moçâmedes, an Angolan railway company

== Science and technology ==
- Cerebral function monitoring, a technique for monitoring electrical activity in the brain over time
- Code Fragment Manager, the linker/loader for PowerPC executables in classic Mac OS
- .cfm, ColdFusion Markup Language filename suffix
- Color filter mosaic, or color filter array
- Confocal microscopy, an optical imaging technique
- Connectivity Fault Management, protocols that help administrators debug Ethernet networks
- Cubic feet per minute, a measurement unit of volume or mass flow

== Other uses ==
- Cadet Forces Medal, recognizing adult volunteers of cadet forces in the UK and New Zealand
- Certified Floodplain Manager, a US civil engineering professional designation
- Chief federal magistrate, in the Federal Circuit Court of Australia
- Club de Foot Montréal, an association football team in Quebec, Canada
