= Frederic A. Gibbs =

American neurologist

Frederic Andrews Gibbs (1903–1992) was an American neurologist who was a pioneer in the use of electroencephalography (EEG) for the diagnosis and treatment of epilepsy.

Gibbs graduated from Yale and Johns Hopkins in 1929. He was offered a fellowship in neuropathology by Stanley Cobb, of Harvard Medical School. He studied epilepsy in the same laboratory as William G. Lennox and Erna Leonhardt.

Erna Leonhardt was Lennox's technical co-worker and had come to Boston as an immigrant from Germany. She married Gibbs in 1930 and they formed a research team that would last a lifetime, publishing papers together over the next fifty-odd years.

The electroencephalograph was primitive in the early 1930s, having only one channel. In 1935, Gibbs asked Albert Grass (an MIT graduate) to build a three-channel EEG. Grass built the machine in his father's basement with the help of his brother. In the same year, Erna and Frederic Gibbs traveled to Europe to attend a conference and visit Hans Berger, the inventor of the EEG.

In 1944, they moved to University of Illinois School of Medicine, and Frederic Gibbs was promoted to professor in the epilepsy clinic.

The Gibbses published the book Atlas of Electroencephalography in 1941, with a second edition in 1951. Their book valued the subjective and experienced eye of an electroencephalographer over objective mechanical or mathematical analysis.

Frederic Gibbs was jointly (with William Lennox) awarded the Albert Lasker Award for Clinical Medical Research in 1951.

Erna Gibbs died in 1987.

== Footnotes ==
1. Niedermeyer, Ernst & Da Silva, Fernando Lopes (November 2004). Electroencephalography: Basic Principles, Clinical Applications, and Related Fields. Lippincott Williams & Wilkins. pp. 8–11. ISBN 0-7817-5126-8.
2. Zottoli, Steven J. (2001). "The Origins of The Grass Foundation" (PDF). Archived from the original (PDF) on February 23, 2006.
3. Jones, Caroline A.; Galison, Peter Louis, eds. (June 1998). Picturing Science Producing Art. Routledge. pp. 334–336. ISBN 0-415-91912-6.
