= ByHours =

Hotel Microstays Platform

BYHOURS
- Website type: Hotel Booking service
- Available in: 7 languages
- Founded: March 2012; 14 years ago
- Headquarters: Barcelona, Catalonia, Spain/ Mexico City, Mexico
- Area served: 24+ countries
- Key people: Guillermo Gaspart (Founder & Chairman) (CEO & Founder)
- Industry: Travel, hotel
- Employees: 20+
- Website: www.byhours.com
- Commercial: Yes
- Current status: Online

BYHOURS is a Spanish company and hotel microstay platform offering hotel stays by the hour. Guests book the hotel for a specific time of arrival and a duration of 3, 6, or 24 hours.

== History ==
The company was founded in March 2012 by Christian Rodríguez and Guillermo Gaspart in Barcelona, Catalonia, Spain. In 2014, according to Travelmole, over 150,000 bookings were made through BYHOURS at over 1,500 hotels in Spain. In 2018, the company reached the first million hours booked in their platform. During 2019, BYHOURS opened a new office in Mexico City, Mexico, and started its new expansion project in Latin America and the United States.

BYHOURS currently has about 60 employees based at its Barcelona headquarters and Mexico City office. BYHOURS offers more than 4,000 hotels by the hour in more than 24 countries around the world and about 600 destinations throughout Europe, Latin America and in travel hubs in the Middle East. The platform also has a mobile application available on Android and iOS.

== Funding ==
In July 2013, BYHOURS raised €600K seed funding from Caixa Capital and Cabiedes Partners. In April 2014, the company received a funding of 2.6 million from Spanish investors. In August 2016, BYHOURS received 1.5 million from European funds and in November 2017, the company announced a funding of 3 million from new international investors as well as existing ones. In January 2020, BYHOURS closed a €8M funding round to continue to grow in Europe, Latin America and the Middle East, as well as expand into the United States.

== Awards and recognition ==
- Best Startup of the Year in 2012 Spain at Ecommerce awards.
- Received eAwards 2014 as the Best App of the Year in Spain
- Won the first prize in the travel and tourism web shop category at the Ecommerce Awards.
- Winner of 2017 Overall Awards – Best Business & Productivity App of 2017 at the Best Mobile Awards.
- 2nd Best APP in #Startmeapp (Huawei and El País)
