= William Kadouch-Chassaing =

William Kadouch-Chassaing is a French business executive. He currently serves as Co-Chief Executive Officer of Eurazeo, alongside Christophe Bavière.

== Biography ==
He is a graduate of the École Normale Supérieure (ENS) de Lyon and Sciences Po. He also holds an agrégation in Economics and Social Sciences.

His father, an Algerian Jew, arrived in France in the 1960s.

He served as an investment banker from 1996 to 2013. He was Head of Strategy and Chief Financial Officer at JPMorgan and Société Générale. He joined Société Générale in 2007.

He was a member of the board of directors of Amundi from 2013 to 2015 and from 2018 to 2022.

In November 2021, Eurazeo announced the appointment of William Kadouch-Chassaing, succeeding Philippe Audouin. In March 2022 he joined the executive board in charge of finance and strategy for the fund.

In February 2023, he became Co-Chief Executive Officer of Eurazeo alongside Christophe Bavière, succeeding Virginie Morgon.

== Other positions ==
- Sorbonne University – Director and member of the board of directors
- Société Générale Algérie SpA – Director and member of the board of directors

He served as a parliamentary assistant to Georges Sarre and worked at the Ministry of Transport.

== Views ==
He considers that Europe presents opportunities for private equity, particularly due to its institutional, financial, and academic stability. Furthermore, he calls for a reallocation of European savings, which are currently invested heavily across the Atlantic.
