= Electroencephalography =

Electrophysiological method to record electrical activity of the brain

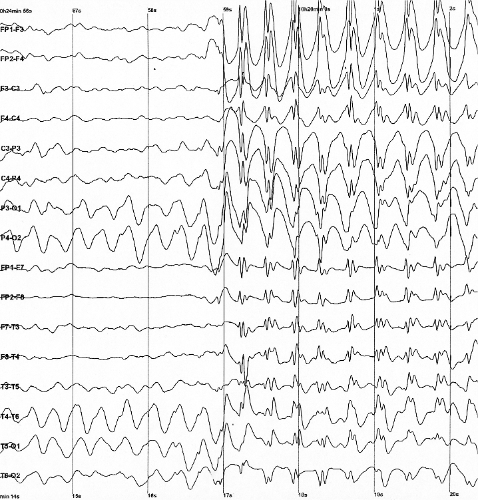
- Epileptic spike and wave discharges monitored by EEG

Electroencephalography (EEG) is a method to record an electrogram of the spontaneous electrical activity of the brain. The bio signals detected by EEG have been shown to represent the postsynaptic potentials of pyramidal neurons in the neocortex and allocortex. It is typically non-invasive, with the EEG electrodes placed along the scalp (commonly called "scalp EEG") using the International 10–20 system, or variations of it. Electrocorticography, involving surgical placement of electrodes, is sometimes called "intracranial EEG". EEG is widely used both as a clinical diagnostic tool, particularly in epilepsy, and as a research tool in neuroscience. Clinical interpretation of EEG recordings is performed by visual inspection of the tracing, which is the standard method. Quantitative EEG analysis may be used as an adjunct in specific clinical settings. Visual interpretation of EEG is subject to inter-rater and intra-rater variability.

Voltage fluctuations measured by the EEG bio amplifier and electrodes allow the evaluation of normal brain activity. As the electrical activity monitored by EEG originates in neurons in the underlying brain tissue, the recordings made by the electrodes on the surface of the scalp vary in accordance with their orientation and distance to the source of the activity. Furthermore, the value recorded is distorted by intermediary tissues and bones, which act in a manner akin to resistors and capacitors in an electrical circuit. This means that not all neurons will contribute equally to an EEG signal, with an EEG predominantly reflecting the activity of cortical neurons near the electrodes on the scalp. Deep structures within the brain further away from the electrodes will not contribute directly to an EEG; these include the base of the cortical gyrus, medial walls of the major lobes, hippocampus, thalamus, and brain stem.

A healthy human EEG will show certain patterns of activity that correlate with how awake a person is. The range of frequencies one observes are between 1 and 30 Hz, and amplitudes will vary between 20 and 100 μV. The observed frequencies are subdivided into various groups: alpha (8–13 Hz), beta (13–30 Hz), delta (0.5–4 Hz), and theta (4–7 Hz). Alpha waves are observed when a person is in a state of relaxed wakefulness and are mostly prominent over the parietal and occipital sites. During intense mental activity, beta waves are more prominent in frontal areas as well as other regions. If a relaxed person is told to open their eyes, one observes alpha activity decreasing and an increase in beta activity. Theta and delta waves are not generally seen in wakefulness – if they are, it is a sign of brain dysfunction.

EEG can detect abnormal electrical discharges such as sharp waves, spikes, or spike-and-wave complexes, as observable in people with epilepsy; thus, it is often used to inform medical diagnosis. EEG can detect the onset and spatio-temporal (location and time) evolution of seizures and the presence of status epilepticus. It is also used to help diagnose sleep disorders, depth of anesthesia, coma, encephalopathies, cerebral hypoxia after cardiac arrest, and brain death. EEG used to be a first-line method of diagnosis for tumors, stroke, and other focal brain disorders, but this use has decreased with the advent of high-resolution anatomical imaging techniques such as magnetic resonance imaging (MRI) and computed tomography (CT). Despite its limited spatial resolution, EEG continues to be a valuable tool for research and diagnosis. It is one of the few mobile techniques available and offers millisecond-range temporal resolution, which is not possible with CT, PET, or MRI.

Derivatives of the EEG technique include evoked potentials (EP), which involves averaging the EEG activity time-locked to the presentation of a stimulus of some sort (visual, somatosensory, or auditory). Event-related potentials (ERPs) refer to averaged EEG responses that are time-locked to more complex processing of stimuli; this technique is used in cognitive science, cognitive psychology, and psychophysiological research.

== Uses ==
=== Epilepsy ===
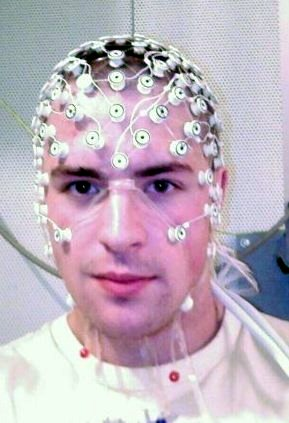
An EEG recording setup using the 10-10 system of electrode placement.

EEG is the gold standard diagnostic procedure to confirm epilepsy. The sensitivity of a routine EEG to detect interictal epileptiform discharges at epilepsy centers has been reported to be in the range of 29–55%. Given the low to moderate sensitivity, a routine EEG (typically with a duration of 20–30 minutes) can be normal in people that have epilepsy. When an EEG shows interictal epileptiform discharges (e.g. sharp waves, spikes, spike-and-wave, etc.) it is confirmatory of epilepsy in nearly all cases (high specificity), however up to 3.5% of the general population may have epileptiform abnormalities in an EEG without ever having had a seizure (low false positive rate) or with a very low risk of developing epilepsy in the future.

When a routine EEG is normal and there is a high suspicion or need to confirm epilepsy, it may be repeated or performed with a longer duration in the epilepsy monitoring unit (EMU) or at home with an ambulatory EEG. In addition, there are activating maneuvers such as photic stimulation, hyperventilation and sleep deprivation that can increase the diagnostic yield of the EEG.

=== Epilepsy Monitoring Unit (EMU) ===
At times, a routine EEG is not sufficient to establish the diagnosis or determine the best course of action in terms of treatment. In this case, attempts may be made to record an EEG while a seizure is occurring. This is known as an ictal recording, as opposed to an interictal recording, which refers to the EEG recording between seizures. To obtain an ictal recording, a prolonged EEG is typically performed accompanied by a time-synchronized video and audio recording. This can be done either as an outpatient (at home) or during a hospital admission, preferably to an Epilepsy Monitoring Unit (EMU) with nurses and other personnel trained in the care of patients with seizures. Outpatient ambulatory video EEGs typically last one to three days. An admission to an Epilepsy Monitoring Unit typically lasts several days but may last for a week or longer. While in the hospital, seizure medications are usually withdrawn to increase the odds that a seizure will occur during admission. For reasons of safety, medications are not withdrawn during an EEG outside of the hospital. Ambulatory video EEGs, therefore, have the advantage of convenience and are less expensive than a hospital admission, but they also have the disadvantage of a decreased probability of recording a clinical event.

Epilepsy monitoring is often considered when patients continue having events despite being on anti-seizure medications or if there is concern that the patient's events have an alternate diagnosis, e.g., psychogenic non-epileptic seizures, syncope (fainting), sub-cortical movement disorders, migraine variants, stroke, etc. In cases of epileptic seizures, continuous EEG monitoring helps to characterize seizures and localize/lateralize the region of the brain from which a seizure originates. This can help identify appropriate non-medication treatment options. In clinical use, EEG traces are visually analyzed by neurologists to look at various features. Increasingly, quantitative analysis of EEG is being used in conjunction with visual analysis. Quantitative analysis displays like power spectrum analysis, alpha-delta ratio, amplitude integrated EEG, and spike detection can help quickly identify segments of EEG that need close visual analysis or, in some cases, be used as surrogates for quick identification of seizures in long-term recordings.

=== Other brain disorders ===
An EEG might also be helpful for diagnosing or treating the following disorders:

- Brain tumor
- Brain damage from head injury
- Brain dysfunction that can have a variety of causes (encephalopathy)
- Inflammation of the brain (encephalitis)
- Stroke
- Sleep disorders

It can also:

- distinguish epileptic seizures from other types of spells, such as psychogenic non-epileptic seizures, syncope (fainting), sub-cortical movement disorders and migraine variants
- differentiate "organic" encephalopathy or delirium from primary psychiatric syndromes such as catatonia
- serve as an adjunct test of brain death in comatose patients
- prognosticate in comatose patients (in certain instances) or in newborns with brain injury from various causes around the time of birth
- determine whether to wean anti-epileptic medications
- in Alzheimer's disease, changes in the frequency of the basic EEG activity as well as prolonged P300 wave latency have been observed and a combined EEG–ERP methodology for assessing cognitive decline was proposed for early detection of cognitive decline.

=== Intensive Care Unit (ICU) ===
EEG can also be used in intensive care units for brain function monitoring to monitor for non-convulsive seizures/non-convulsive status epilepticus, to monitor the effect of sedative/anesthesia in patients in medically induced coma (for treatment of refractory seizures or increased intracranial pressure), and to monitor for secondary brain damage in conditions such as subarachnoid hemorrhage (currently a research method).

In cases where significant brain injury is suspected, e.g., after cardiac arrest, EEG can provide some prognostic information.

If a patient with epilepsy is being considered for resective surgery to treat epilepsy, it is often necessary to localize the focus (source) of the epileptic brain activity with a resolution greater than what is provided by scalp EEG. In these cases, neurosurgeons typically implant strips and grids of electrodes or penetrating depth electrodes under the dura mater, through either a craniotomy or a burr hole. The recording of these signals is referred to as electrocorticography (ECoG), subdural EEG (SDE), intracranial EEG (iEEG), or stereotactic EEG (SEEG). The signal recorded from ECoG is on a different scale of activity than the brain activity recorded from scalp EEG. Low-voltage, high-frequency components that cannot be seen easily (or at all) in scalp EEG can be seen clearly in ECoG. Further, smaller electrodes (which cover a smaller parcel of brain surface) allow for better spatial resolution to narrow down the areas critical for seizure onset and propagation. Some clinical sites record data from penetrating microelectrodes.

=== Home ambulatory EEG ===
Sometimes it is more convenient or clinically necessary to perform ambulatory EEG recordings in the home of the person being tested. These studies typically have a duration of 24–72 hours.

== Research use ==
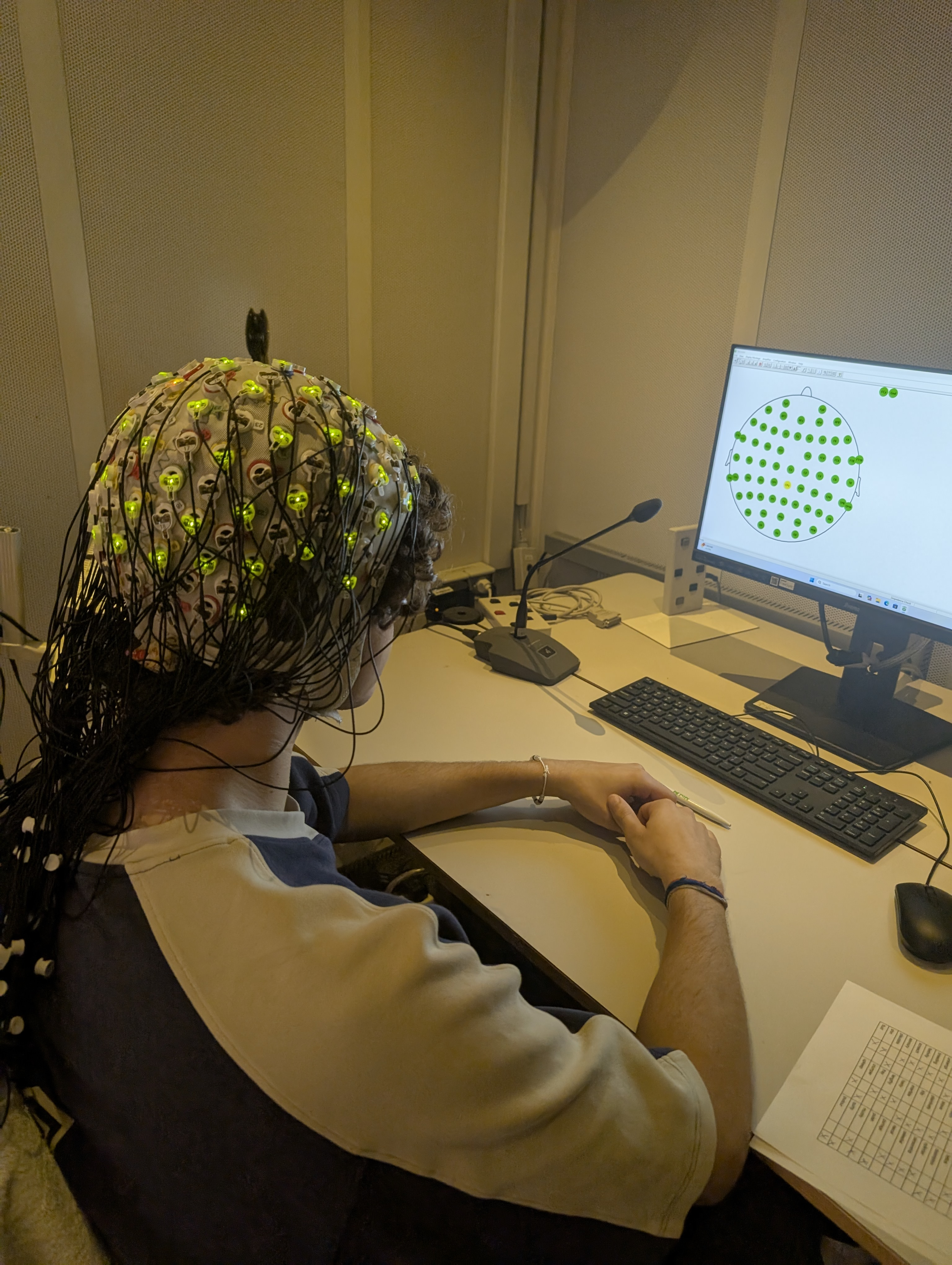
A person taking part in an EEG-based neuroscience experiment

EEG and the related study of ERPs are used extensively in neuroscience, cognitive science, cognitive psychology, neurolinguistics, and psychophysiological research, as well as to study human functions such as swallowing. Any EEG techniques used in research are not sufficiently standardised for clinical use, and many ERP studies fail to report all of the necessary processing steps for data collection and reduction, limiting the reproducibility and replicability of many studies. Based on a 2024 systematic literature review and meta analysis commissioned by the Patient-Centered Outcomes Research Institute (PCORI), EEG scans cannot be used reliably to assist in making a clinical diagnosis of ADHD. However, EEG continues to be used in research on mental disabilities, such as auditory processing disorder (APD), ADD, and ADHD. EEGs have also been studied for their utility in detecting neurophysiological changes in the brain after concussion, however, at this time there are no advanced imaging techniques that can be used clinically to diagnose or monitor recovery from concussion.

=== Advantages ===
Several other methods to study brain function exist, including functional magnetic resonance imaging (fMRI), positron emission tomography (PET), magnetoencephalography (MEG), nuclear magnetic resonance spectroscopy (NMR or MRS), electrocorticography (ECoG), single-photon emission computed tomography (SPECT), near-infrared spectroscopy (NIRS), and event-related optical signal (EROS). Despite the relatively poor spatial sensitivity of EEG, the "one-dimensional signals from localised peripheral regions on the head make it attractive for its simplistic fidelity and has allowed high clinical and basic research throughput". Thus, EEG possesses some advantages over some of those other techniques:

- Hardware costs are significantly lower than those of most other techniques
- EEG prevents limited availability of technologists to provide immediate care in high traffic hospitals.
- EEG only requires a quiet room and briefcase-size equipment, whereas fMRI, SPECT, PET, MRS, or MEG require bulky and immobile equipment. For example, MEG requires equipment consisting of liquid helium-cooled detectors that can be used only in magnetically shielded rooms, altogether costing upwards of several million dollars; and fMRI requires the use of a 1-ton magnet in, again, a shielded room.
- EEG can readily have a high temporal resolution, (although sub-millisecond resolution generates less meaningful data), because the two to 32 data streams generated by that number of electrodes is easily stored and processed, whereas 3D spatial technologies provide thousands or millions times as many input data streams, and are thus limited by hardware and software. EEG is commonly recorded at sampling rates between 250 and 2000 Hz in clinical and research settings.
- EEG is relatively tolerant of subject movement, unlike most other neuroimaging techniques. There even exist methods for minimizing, and even eliminating movement artifacts in EEG data
- EEG is silent, which allows for better study of the responses to auditory stimuli.
- EEG does not aggravate claustrophobia, unlike fMRI, PET, MRS, SPECT, and sometimes MEG
- EEG does not involve exposure to high-intensity (>1 tesla) magnetic fields, as in some of the other techniques, especially MRI and MRS. These can cause a variety of undesirable issues with the data, and also prohibit use of these techniques with participants that have metal implants in their body, such as metal-containing pacemakers
- EEG does not involve exposure to radioligands, unlike positron emission tomography.
- ERP studies can be conducted with relatively simple paradigms, compared with IE block-design fMRI studies
- Relatively non-invasive, in contrast to electrocorticography, which requires electrodes to be placed on the actual surface of the brain.

EEG also has some characteristics that compare favorably with behavioral testing:

- EEG can detect covert processing (i.e., processing that does not require a response)
- EEG can be used in subjects who are incapable of making a motor response
- Some ERP components can be detected even when the subject is not attending to the stimuli
- Unlike other means of studying reaction time, ERPs can elucidate stages of processing (rather than just the result)
- the simplicity of EEG readily provides for tracking of brain changes during different phases of life. EEG sleep analysis can indicate significant aspects of the timing of brain development, including evaluating adolescent brain maturation.
- In EEG there is a better understanding of what signal is measured as compared to other research techniques, e.g. the BOLD response in MRI.

=== Disadvantages ===
- Low spatial resolution on the scalp. fMRI, for example, can directly display areas of the brain that are active, while EEG requires intense interpretation just to hypothesize what areas are activated by a particular response.
- Depending on the orientation and location of the dipole causing an EEG change, there may be a false localization due to the inverse problem.
- EEG poorly measures neural activity that occurs below the upper layers of the brain (the cortex).
- Unlike PET and MRS, EEG cannot identify specific locations in the brain at which various neurotransmitters, drugs, etc. can be found.
- Often takes a long time to connect a subject to EEG, as it requires precise placement of dozens of electrodes around the head and the use of various gels, saline solutions, and pastes to maintain good conductivity, and a cap is used to keep them in place. While the length of time differs dependent on the specific EEG device used, as a general rule it takes considerably less time to prepare a subject for MEG, fMRI, MRS, and SPECT.
- Signal-to-noise ratio is poor, so sophisticated data analysis and relatively large numbers of subjects are needed to extract useful information from EEG.
- EEGs are not currently very compatible with individuals who have coarser or textured hair. Even protective styles can pose issues during testing. Researchers are currently trying to build better options for patients and technicians alike Furthermore, researchers are starting to implement more culturally-informed data collection practices to help reduce racial biases in EEG research.

=== With other neuroimaging techniques ===
Simultaneous EEG recordings and fMRI scans have been obtained successfully, though recording both at the same time effectively requires that several technical difficulties be overcome, such as the presence of ballistocardiographic artifact, MRI pulse artifact and the induction of electrical currents in EEG wires that move within the strong magnetic fields of the MRI. While challenging, these have been successfully overcome in a number of studies.

MRI's produce detailed images created by generating strong magnetic fields that may induce potentially harmful displacement force and torque. These fields produce potentially harmful radio frequency heating and create image artifacts rendering images useless. Due to these potential risks, only certain medical devices can be used in an MR environment.

Similarly, simultaneous recordings with MEG and EEG have also been conducted, which has several advantages over using either technique alone:

- EEG requires accurate information about certain aspects of the skull that can only be estimated, such as skull radius, and conductivities of various skull locations. MEG does not have this issue, and a simultaneous analysis allows this to be corrected for.
- MEG and EEG both detect activity below the surface of the cortex very poorly, and like EEG, the level of error increases with the depth below the surface of the cortex one attempts to examine. However, the errors are very different between the techniques, and combining them thus allows for correction of some of this noise.
- MEG has access to virtually no sources of brain activity below a few centimetres under the cortex. EEG, on the other hand, can receive signals from greater depth, albeit with a high degree of noise. Combining the two makes it easier to determine what in the EEG signal comes from the surface (since MEG is very accurate in examining signals from the surface of the brain), and what comes from deeper in the brain, thus allowing for analysis of deeper brain signals than either EEG or MEG on its own.

Recently, a combined EEG/MEG (EMEG) approach has been investigated for the purpose of source reconstruction in epilepsy diagnosis.

EEG has also been combined with positron emission tomography. This provides the advantage of allowing researchers to see what EEG signals are associated with different drug actions in the brain.

Recent studies using machine learning techniques such as neural networks with statistical temporal features extracted from frontal lobe EEG brainwave data has shown high levels of success in classifying mental states (Relaxed, Neutral, Concentrating), mental emotional states (Negative, Neutral, Positive) and thalamocortical dysrhythmia.

=== Use in children ===
A 2020 World Health Organization report identified resting-state EEG as a gold-standard measure of brain health, and the technique is widely used to study brain development in infants and children, including how early adversity relates to neural function.

A meta-analysis of the literature on early adversity and resting-state EEG power found that early adversity was reliably related to brain activity across childhood. Research drawing on Baby's First Years, a randomized controlled trial of unconditional cash transfers to families with low income, showed preliminary evidence these relations may be causal with infants in households receiving larger monthly cash gifts showed greater power in higher-frequency EEG bands than infants in households receiving nominal cash gifts, offering causal evidence that income may influence infant brain function. A four-year follow-up of the same cohort found no significant effect on the study's primary preregistered brain-activity outcome, though exploratory analyses suggested a possible effect on alpha-band power in preschoolers, illustrating both the promise and the uncertainty of using EEG as an outcome measure in long-term intervention research.

Separately, maternal stress during pregnancy and infancy has been linked to patterns of infant resting EEG activity, including increased lower-frequency (theta) power and decreased mid-frequency (alpha) power, in samples of families experiencing poverty. A preregistered investigation of prenatal maternal stress found that maternal perceived stress, but not maternal hair cortisol concentration (a marker of longer-term physiological stress), was associated with infant theta and alpha power at one month of age.

Pediatric and developmental populations pose distinct methodological challenges for EEG, including shorter attention spans, greater motion artifact, and hair-related recording obstacles, which have prompted dedicated research into collection and analysis methods for infants and children. A survey of developmental EEG experts found little consensus on preprocessing and analytic choices—such as artifact-rejection thresholds, frequency-band boundaries, and use of absolute versus relative power—even when researchers were given an identical hypothetical dataset. A subsequent systematic review of the pediatric EEG literature confirmed substantial, largely unexplained variability in data collection, preprocessing, and reporting practices across published studies, and proposed a standardized reporting checklist (RECAP-EEG) to improve reproducibility.

Researchers have also examined whether power should be reported in absolute or relative terms in developmental samples. While relative power (power in one frequency band as a proportion of total power) is often assumed to control for non-neural sources of variability such as skull thickness or hair type, empirical comparisons across pediatric datasets found that relative power does not uniformly correct for such factors and instead offers a complementary, rather than superior, representation of spectral activity.

Mobile and in-home EEG systems have been developed and validated to extend data collection to infants and families who might not otherwise participate in laboratory-based research, including low-income and racially diverse populations. Studies using such methods have shown that traditional EEG equipment and recording protocols disproportionately exclude children with thicker, curlier, or coarser hair textures, constituting a source of unintentional bias in participant representation; researchers have proposed modified electrode designs and capping procedures to improve inclusion of Black and Latinx participants in pediatric EEG research.

== Mechanisms ==
The brain's electrical charge is maintained by billions of neurons. Neurons are electrically charged (or "polarized") by membrane transport proteins that pump ions across their membranes. Neurons are constantly exchanging ions with the extracellular milieu, for example to maintain resting potential and to propagate action potentials. Ions of similar charge repel each other, and when many ions are pushed out of many neurons at the same time, they can push their neighbours, who push their neighbours, and so on, in a wave. This process is known as volume conduction. When the wave of ions reaches the electrodes on the scalp, they can push or pull electrons on the metal in the electrodes. Since metal conducts the push and pull of electrons easily, the difference in push or pull voltages between any two electrodes can be measured by a voltmeter. Recording these voltages over time gives us the EEG.

The electric potential generated by an individual neuron is far too small to be picked up by EEG or MEG. EEG activity therefore always reflects the summation of the synchronous activity of thousands or millions of neurons that have similar spatial orientation. If the cells do not have similar spatial orientation, their ions do not line up and create waves to be detected. Pyramidal neurons of the cortex are thought to produce the most EEG signal because they are well-aligned and fire together. Because voltage field gradients fall off with the square of distance, activity from deep sources is more difficult to detect than currents near the skull.

Scalp EEG activity shows oscillations at a variety of frequencies. Several of these oscillations have characteristic frequency ranges, spatial distributions and are associated with different states of brain functioning (e.g., waking and the various sleep stages). These oscillations represent synchronized activity over a network of neurons. The neuronal networks underlying some of these oscillations are understood (e.g., the thalamocortical resonance underlying sleep spindles), while many others are not (e.g., the system that generates the posterior basic rhythm). Research that measures both EEG and neuron spiking finds the relationship between the two is complex, with a combination of EEG power in the gamma band and phase in the delta band relating most strongly to neuron spike activity.

== Method ==
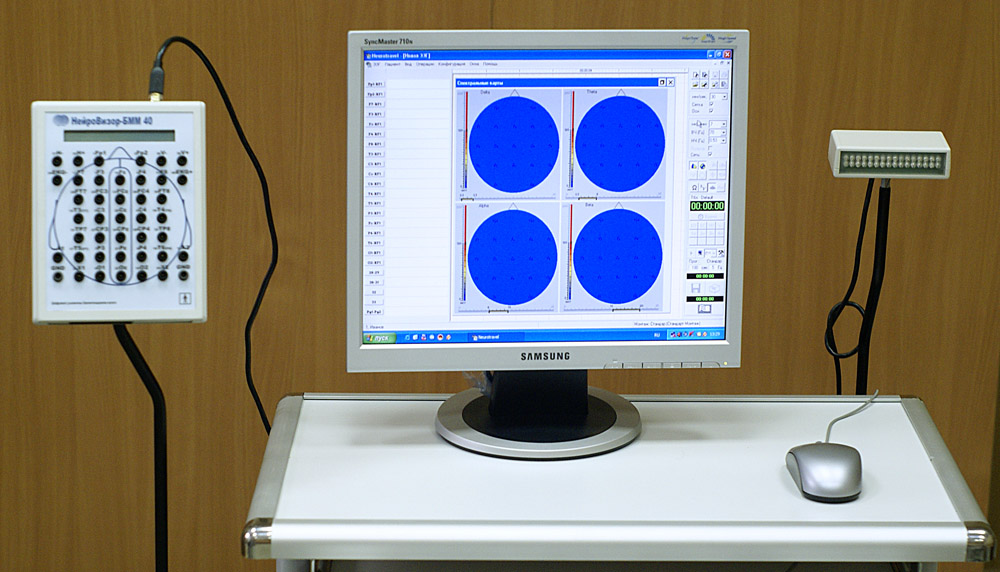
Computer electroencephalograph Neurovisor-BMM 40 produced and offered in Russia

In conventional scalp EEG, the recording is obtained by placing electrodes on the scalp with a conductive gel or paste, usually after preparing the scalp area by light abrasion to reduce impedance due to dead skin cells. Many systems typically use electrodes, each of which is attached to an individual wire. Some systems use caps or nets into which electrodes are embedded; this is particularly common when high-density arrays of electrodes are needed.

Electrode locations and names are specified by the International 10–20 system for most clinical and research applications (except when high-density arrays are used). This system ensures that the naming of electrodes is consistent across laboratories. In most clinical applications, 19 recording electrodes (plus ground and system reference) are used. A smaller number of electrodes are typically used when recording EEG from neonates. Additional electrodes can be added to the standard set-up when a clinical or research application demands increased spatial resolution for a particular area of the brain. High-density arrays (typically via cap or net) can contain up to 256 electrodes more-or-less evenly spaced around the scalp.

Each electrode is connected to one input of a differential amplifier (one amplifier per pair of electrodes); a common system reference electrode is connected to the other input of each differential amplifier. These amplifiers amplify the voltage between the active electrode and the reference (typically 1,000–100,000 times, or 60–100 dB of power gain). In analog EEG, the signal is then filtered (next paragraph), and the EEG signal is output as the deflection of pens as paper passes underneath. Most EEG systems these days, however, are digital, and the amplified signal is digitized via an analog-to-digital converter, after being passed through an anti-aliasing filter. Analog-to-digital sampling typically occurs at 256–512 Hz in clinical scalp EEG; sampling rates of up to 20 kHz are used in some research applications.

During the recording, a series of activation procedures may be used. These procedures may induce normal or abnormal EEG activity that might not otherwise be seen. These procedures include hyperventilation, photic stimulation (with a strobe light), eye closure, mental activity, sleep and sleep deprivation. During (inpatient) epilepsy monitoring, a patient's typical seizure medications may be withdrawn.

The digital EEG signal is stored electronically and can be filtered for display. Typical settings for the high-pass filter and a low-pass filter are 0.5–1 Hz and 35–70 Hz respectively. The high-pass filter typically filters out slow artifact, such as electrogalvanic signals and movement artifact, whereas the low-pass filter filters out high-frequency artifacts, such as electromyographic signals. An additional notch filter is typically used to remove artifact caused by electrical power lines (60 Hz in the United States and 50 Hz in many other countries).

The EEG signals can be captured with opensource hardware such as OpenBCI and the signal can be processed by freely available EEG software such as EEGLAB or the Neurophysiological Biomarker Toolbox.

As part of an evaluation for epilepsy surgery, it may be necessary to insert electrodes near the surface of the brain, under the surface of the dura mater. This is accomplished via burr hole or craniotomy. This is referred to variously as "electrocorticography (ECoG)", "intracranial EEG (I-EEG)" or "subdural EEG (SD-EEG)". Depth electrodes may also be placed into brain structures, such as the amygdala or hippocampus, structures, which are common epileptic foci and may not be "seen" clearly by scalp EEG. The electrocorticographic signal is processed in the same manner as digital scalp EEG (above), with a couple of caveats. ECoG is typically recorded at higher sampling rates than scalp EEG because of the requirements of Nyquist theorem – the subdural signal is composed of a higher predominance of higher frequency components. Also, many of the artifacts that affect scalp EEG do not impact ECoG, and therefore display filtering is often not needed.

A typical adult human EEG signal is about 10 μV to 100 μV in amplitude when measured from the scalp.

Since an EEG voltage signal represents a difference between the voltages at two electrodes, the display of the EEG for the reading electroencephalographer may be set up in one of several ways. The representation of the EEG channels is referred to as a montage.

=== Sequential montage ===
Each channel (i.e., waveform) represents the difference between two adjacent electrodes. The entire montage consists of a series of these channels. For example, the channel "Fp1-F3" represents the difference in voltage between the Fp1 electrode and the F3 electrode. The next channel in the montage, "F3-C3", represents the voltage difference between F3 and C3, and so on through the entire array of electrodes.

=== Referential montage ===
Each channel represents the difference between a certain electrode and a designated reference electrode. There is no standard position for this reference; it is, however, at a different position than the "recording" electrodes. Midline positions are often used because they do not amplify the signal in one hemisphere vs. the other, such as Cz, Oz, Pz etc. as online reference. The other popular offline references are:

- REST reference: which is an offline computational reference at infinity where the potential is zero. REST (reference electrode standardization technique) takes the equivalent sources inside the brain of any a set of scalp recordings as springboard to link the actual recordings with any an online or offline( average, linked ears etc.) non-zero reference to the new recordings with infinity zero as the standardized reference.
- "linked ears": which is a physical or mathematical average of electrodes attached to both earlobes or mastoids.

=== Average reference montage ===
The outputs of all of the amplifiers are summed and averaged, and this averaged signal is used as the common reference for each channel.

=== Laplacian montage ===
Each channel represents the difference between an electrode and a weighted average of the surrounding electrodes.

When analog (paper) EEGs are used, the technologist switches between montages during the recording in order to highlight or better characterize certain features of the EEG. With digital EEG, all signals are typically digitized and stored in a particular (usually referential) montage; since any montage can be constructed mathematically from any other, the EEG can be viewed by the electroencephalographer in any display montage that is desired.

The EEG is read by a clinical neurophysiologist or neurologist (depending on local custom and law regarding medical specialities), optimally one who has specific training in the interpretation of EEGs for clinical purposes. This is done by visual inspection of the waveforms, called graphoelements. The use of computer signal processing of the EEG – so-called quantitative electroencephalography – is somewhat controversial when used for clinical purposes (although there are many research uses).

=== Dry EEG electrodes ===
In the early 1990s Babak Taheri, at University of California, Davis demonstrated the first single and also multichannel dry active electrode arrays using micro-machining. The single channel dry EEG electrode construction and results were published in 1994. The arrayed electrode was also demonstrated to perform well compared to silver/silver chloride electrodes. The device consisted of four sites of sensors with integrated electronics to reduce noise by impedance matching. The advantages of such electrodes are: (1) no electrolyte used, (2) no skin preparation, (3) significantly reduced sensor size, and (4) compatibility with EEG monitoring systems. The active electrode array is an integrated system made of an array of capacitive sensors with local integrated circuitry housed in a package with batteries to power the circuitry. This level of integration was required to achieve the functional performance obtained by the electrode. The electrode was tested on an electrical test bench and on human subjects in four modalities of EEG activity, namely: (1) spontaneous EEG, (2) sensory event-related potentials, (3) brain stem potentials, and (4) cognitive event-related potentials. The performance of the dry electrode compared favorably with that of the standard wet electrodes in terms of skin preparation, no gel requirements (dry), and higher signal-to-noise ratio.

In 1999 researchers at Case Western Reserve University, in Cleveland, Ohio, led by Hunter Peckham, used 64-electrode EEG skullcap to return limited hand movements to quadriplegic Jim Jatich. As Jatich concentrated on simple but opposite concepts like up and down, his beta-rhythm EEG output was analysed using software to identify patterns in the noise. A basic pattern was identified and used to control a switch: Above average activity was set to on, below average off. As well as enabling Jatich to control a computer cursor the signals were also used to drive the nerve controllers embedded in his hands, restoring some movement.

In 2018, a functional dry electrode composed of a polydimethylsiloxane elastomer filled with conductive carbon nanofibers was reported. This research was conducted at the U.S. Army Research Laboratory. EEG technology often involves applying a gel to the scalp which facilitates strong signal-to-noise ratio. This results in more reproducible and reliable experimental results. Since patients dislike having their hair filled with gel, and the lengthy setup requires trained staff on hand, utilizing EEG outside the laboratory setting can be difficult. Additionally, it has been observed that wet electrode sensors' performance reduces after a span of hours. Therefore, research has been directed to developing dry and semi-dry EEG bioelectronic interfaces.

Hybrid dry–wet EEG electrode systems have also been developed to combine the rapid setup of dry electrodes with the signal stability of gel-based recordings. One example is the g.SAHARA Hybrid EEG electrode system, developed by g.tec medical engineering GmbH, an Austria-based neurotechnology company. The system uses active electrodes made of a conductive polymer with multiple pins designed to maintain contact through hair, allowing EEG recordings to be performed either without gel or with optional conductive gel applied through a central opening. This hybrid approach is intended to reduce electrode–skin impedance while preserving setup flexibility, and it has been used in research settings across standard EEG positions defined by the international 10–20 system.

Dry electrode signals depend upon mechanical contact. Therefore, it can be difficult getting a usable signal because of impedance between the skin and the electrode. Some EEG systems attempt to circumvent this issue by applying a saline solution. Others have a semi dry nature and release small amounts of the gel upon contact with the scalp. Another solution uses spring loaded pin setups. These may be uncomfortable. They may also be dangerous if they were used in a situation where a patient could bump their head since they could become lodged after an impact trauma incident.

Currently, headsets are available incorporating dry electrodes with up to 30 channels. Such designs are able to compensate for some of the signal quality degradation related to high impedances by optimizing pre-amplification, shielding and supporting mechanics.

=== Limitations ===
EEG has several limitations. Most important is its poor spatial resolution. EEG is most sensitive to a particular set of post-synaptic potentials: those generated in superficial layers of the cortex, on the crests of gyri directly abutting the skull and radial to the skull. Dendrites which are deeper in the cortex, inside sulci, in midline or deep structures (such as the cingulate gyrus or hippocampus), or producing currents that are tangential to the skull, make far less contribution to the EEG signal.

EEG recordings do not directly capture axonal action potentials. An action potential can be accurately represented as a current quadrupole, meaning that the resulting field decreases more rapidly than the ones produced by the current dipole of post-synaptic potentials. In addition, since EEGs represent averages of thousands of neurons, a large population of cells in synchronous activity is necessary to cause a significant deflection on the recordings. Action potentials are very fast and, as a consequence, the chances of field summation are slim. However, neural backpropagation, as a typically longer dendritic current dipole, can be picked up by EEG electrodes and is a reliable indication of the occurrence of neural output.

Not only do EEGs capture dendritic currents almost exclusively as opposed to axonal currents, they also show a preference for activity on populations of parallel dendrites and transmitting current in the same direction at the same time. Pyramidal neurons of cortical layers II/III and V extend apical dendrites to layer I. Currents moving up or down these processes underlie most of the signals produced by electroencephalography.

EEG thus provides information with a large bias in favor of particular neuron types, locations and orientations. So it generally should not be used to make claims about global brain activity. The meninges, cerebrospinal fluid and skull "smear" the EEG signal, obscuring its intracranial source.

It is mathematically impossible to reconstruct a unique intracranial current source for a given EEG signal, as some currents produce potentials that cancel each other out. This is referred to as the inverse problem. However, much work has been done to produce remarkably good estimates of, at least, a localized electric dipole that represents the recorded currents.

=== EEG's benefits over fMRI, fNIRS, fUS and PET ===
EEG has several strong points as a tool for exploring brain activity. EEG have excellent temporal resolution and can detect changes over milliseconds, which is particularly useful to assess a reaction to a stimulus considering an action potential takes approximately 0.5–130 milliseconds to propagate across a single neuron, depending on the type of neuron. Other methods of looking at brain activity, such as PET, fMRI or fUS have time resolution between seconds and minutes. EEG measures the brain's electrical activity directly, while other methods record changes in blood flow (e.g., SPECT, fMRI, fUS) or metabolic activity (e.g., PET, NIRS), which are indirect markers of brain electrical activity.

EEG can be used simultaneously with fMRI or fUS so that high-temporal-resolution data can be recorded at the same time as high-spatial-resolution data, however, since the data derived from each occurs over a different time course, the data sets do not necessarily represent exactly the same brain activity. There are technical difficulties associated with combining EEG and fMRI including the need to remove the MRI gradient artifact present during MRI acquisition. Furthermore, currents can be induced in moving EEG electrode wires due to the magnetic field of the MRI.

EEG can be used simultaneously with NIRS or fUS without major technical difficulties. There is no influence of these modalities on each other and a combined measurement can give useful information about electrical activity as well as hemodynamics at medium spatial resolution.

EEG is also frequently combined with functional near-infrared spectroscopy (fNIRS) to enable simultaneous measurement of fast neuronal electrical activity and slower hemodynamic responses associated with neurovascular coupling. In such multimodal approaches, EEG provides millisecond-level temporal resolution, while fNIRS contributes complementary information on changes in oxygenated and deoxygenated hemoglobin with moderate spatial resolution. Combined EEG–fNIRS measurements can be performed without major technical interference between modalities and are therefore well suited for studies conducted outside highly controlled imaging environments. Integrated wireless EEG–fNIRS research systems have been developed to support synchronized data acquisition in a single wearable setup, including platforms such as the g.Nautilus wireless EEG and fNIRS headset produced by g.tec medical engineering GmbH, which enables concurrent recording of multi-channel EEG and fNIRS signals for applications in cognitive neuroscience, brain–computer interface research, and neurorehabilitation.

=== EEG vis-à-vis MEG ===
EEG reflects correlated synaptic activity caused by post-synaptic potentials of cortical neurons. The ionic currents involved in the generation of fast action potentials may not contribute greatly to the averaged field potentials representing the EEG. More specifically, the scalp electrical potentials that produce EEG are generally thought to be caused by the extracellular ionic currents caused by dendritic electrical activity, whereas the fields producing magnetoencephalographic signals are associated with intracellular ionic currents.

== Normal activity ==
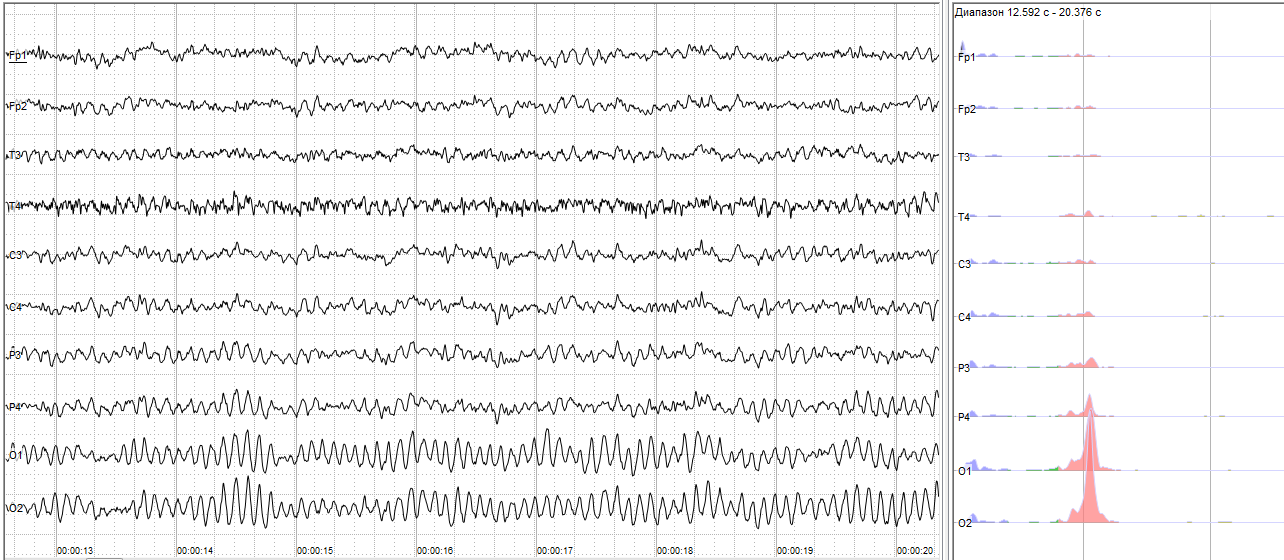
Human EEG with prominent resting state activity – alpha-rhythm. Left: EEG traces (horizontal – time in seconds; vertical – amplitudes, scale 100 μV). Right: power spectra of shown signals (vertical lines – 10 and 20 Hz, scale is linear). Alpha-rhythm consists of sinusoidal-like waves with frequencies in 8–12 Hz range (11 Hz in this case) more prominent in posterior sites. Alpha range is red at power spectrum graph.

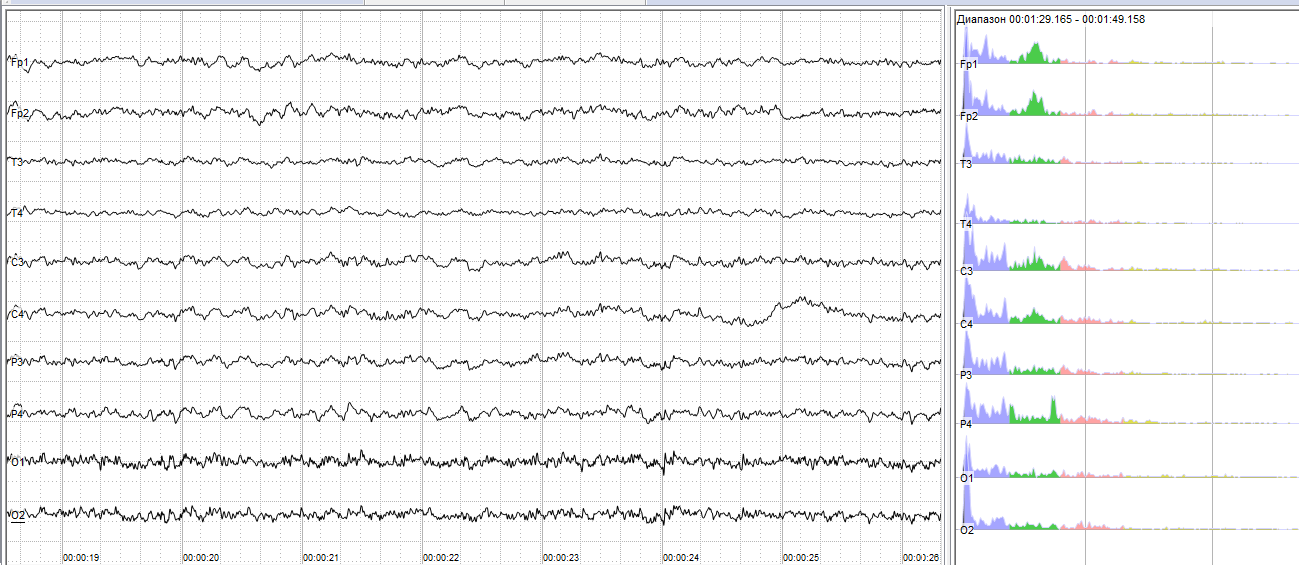
Human EEG with in resting state. Left: EEG traces (horizontal – time in seconds; vertical – amplitudes, scale 100 μV). Right: power spectra of shown signals (vertical lines – 10 and 20 Hz, scale is linear). 80–90% of people have prominent sinusoidal-like waves with frequencies in 8–12 Hz range – alpha rhythm. Others (like this) lack this type of activity.

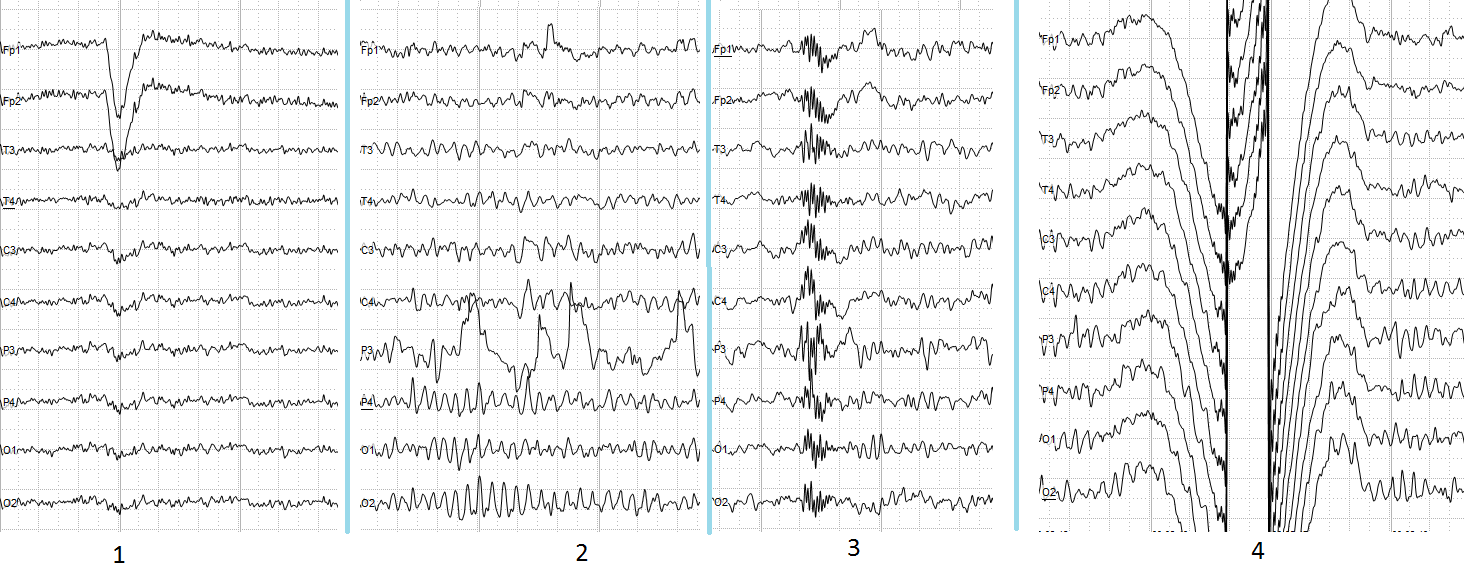
Common artifacts in human EEG. 1: Electrooculographic artifact caused by the excitation of eyeball's muscles (related to blinking, for example). Big-amplitude, slow, positive wave prominent in frontal electrodes. 2: Electrode's artifact caused by bad contact (and thus bigger impedance) between P3 electrode and skin. 3: Swallowing artifact. 4: Common reference electrode's artifact caused by bad contact between reference electrode and skin. Huge wave similar in all channels.

One second of EEG signal

The EEG is typically described in terms of (1) rhythmic activity and (2) transients. The rhythmic activity is divided into bands by frequency. To some degree, these frequency bands are a matter of nomenclature (i.e., any rhythmic activity between 8–12 Hz can be described as "alpha"), but these designations arose because rhythmic activity within a certain frequency range was noted to have a certain distribution over the scalp or a certain biological significance. Frequency bands are usually extracted using spectral methods (for instance Welch) as implemented for instance in freely available EEG software such as EEGLAB or the Neurophysiological Biomarker Toolbox. Computational processing of the EEG is often named quantitative electroencephalography (qEEG).

Most of the cerebral signal observed in the scalp EEG falls in the range of 1–20 Hz (activity below or above this range is likely to be artifactual, under standard clinical recording techniques). Waveforms are subdivided into bandwidths known as alpha, beta, theta, and delta to signify the majority of the EEG used in clinical practice.

=== Comparison of EEG bands ===
Comparison of EEG bands
Band	Frequency (Hz)	Location	Normally	Pathologically
Delta	< 4	frontally in adults, posteriorly in children; high-amplitude waves	adult slow-wave sleep; in babies; Has been found during some continuous-attention tasks	subcortical lesions; diffuse lesions; metabolic encephalopathy hydrocephalus; deep midline lesions
Theta	4–7	Found in locations not related to task at hand	higher in young children; drowsiness in adults and teens; idling; Associated with inhibition of elicited responses (has been found to spike in situations where a person is actively trying to repress a response or action).	focal subcortical lesions; metabolic encephalopathy; deep midline disorders; some instances of hydrocephalus
Alpha	8–12	posterior regions of head, both sides, higher in amplitude on dominant side. Central sites (c3-c4) at rest	relaxed/reflecting; closing the eyes; Also associated with inhibition control, seemingly with the purpose of timing inhibitory activity in different locations across the brain.	coma
Beta	13–30	both sides, symmetrical distribution, most evident frontally; low-amplitude waves	range span: active calm → intense → stressed → mild obsessive; active thinking, focus, high alert, anxious	benzodiazepines; Dup15q syndrome
Gamma	> 32	Somatosensory cortex	Displays during cross-modal sensory processing (perception that combines two different senses, such as sound and sight); Also is shown during short-term memory matching of recognized objects, sounds, or tactile sensations	A decrease in gamma-band activity may be associated with cognitive decline, especially when related to the theta band; however, this has not been proven for use as a clinical diagnostic measurement
Mu	8–12	Sensorimotor cortex	Shows rest-state motor neurons.	Mu suppression could indicate that motor mirror neurons are working. Deficits in Mu suppression, and thus in mirror neurons, might play a role in autism.

The practice of using only whole numbers in the definitions comes from practical considerations in the days when only whole cycles could be counted on paper records. This leads to gaps in the definitions, as seen elsewhere on this page. The theoretical definitions have always been more carefully defined to include all frequencies. Unfortunately there is no agreement in standard reference works on what these ranges should be – values for the upper end of alpha and lower end of beta include 12, 13, 14 and 15. If the threshold is taken as 14 Hz, then the slowest beta wave has about the same duration as the longest spike (70 ms), which makes this the most useful value.

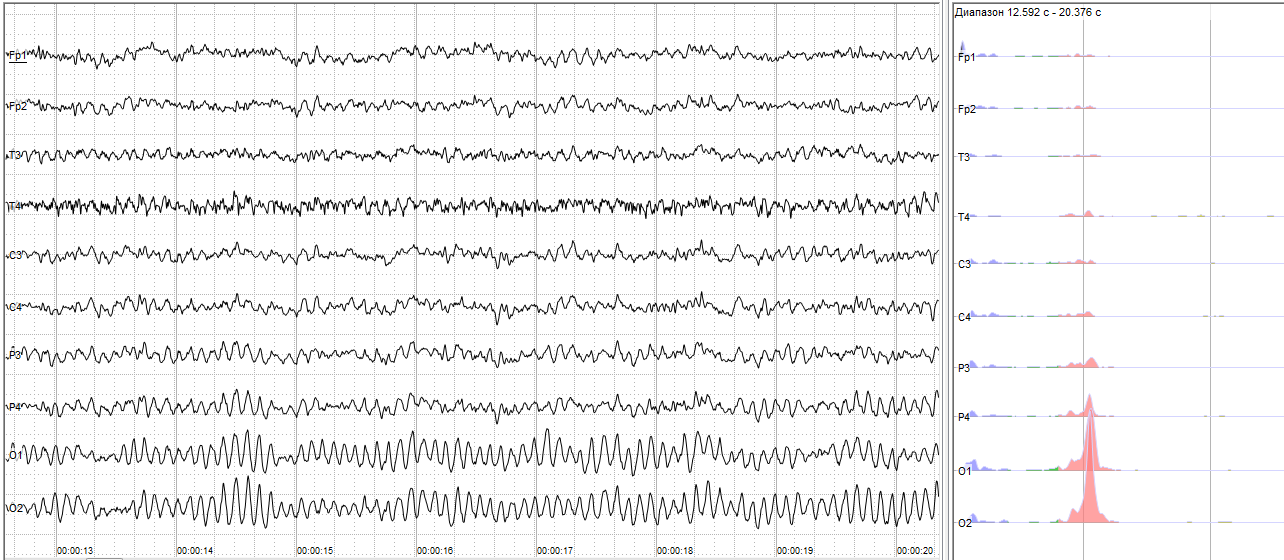
Human EEG with prominent alpha-rhythm

=== Wave patterns ===
Delta waves

- Delta is the frequency range up to 4 Hz. It tends to be the highest in amplitude and the slowest waves. It is normally seen in adults during slow-wave sleep, and in babies. It may occur focally with subcortical lesions and in general distribution with diffuse lesions, metabolic encephalopathy hydrocephalus or deep midline lesions. It is usually most prominent frontally in adults (e.g. FIRDA – frontal intermittent rhythmic delta) and posteriorly in children (e.g. OIRDA – occipital intermittent rhythmic delta).

Theta waves

- Theta is the frequency range from 4 Hz to 7 Hz. Theta is seen normally in young children. It may be seen in drowsiness or arousal in older children and adults; it can also be seen in meditation. Excess theta for age represents abnormal activity. It can be seen as a focal disturbance in focal subcortical lesions; it can be seen in generalized distribution in diffuse disorder or metabolic encephalopathy or deep midline disorders or some instances of hydrocephalus. On the contrary this range has been associated with reports of relaxed, meditative, and creative states.

Alpha waves

- Alpha is the frequency range from 8 Hz to 12 Hz. Hans Berger named the first rhythmic EEG activity he observed the "alpha wave". This was the "posterior basic rhythm" (also called the "posterior dominant rhythm" or the "posterior alpha rhythm"), seen in the posterior regions of the head on both sides, higher in amplitude on the dominant side. It emerges with closing of the eyes and with relaxation, and attenuates with eye opening or mental exertion. The posterior basic rhythm is actually slower than 8 Hz in young children (therefore technically in the theta range).

Sensorimotor rhythm aka mu rhythm

In addition to the posterior basic rhythm, there are other normal alpha rhythms such as the mu rhythm (alpha activity in the contralateral sensory and motor cortical areas) that emerges when the hands and arms are idle; and the "third rhythm" (alpha activity in the temporal or frontal lobes). Alpha can be abnormal; for example, an EEG that has diffuse alpha occurring in coma and is not responsive to external stimuli is referred to as "alpha coma".

Beta waves

- Beta is the frequency range from 13 Hz to about 30 Hz. It is seen usually on both sides in symmetrical distribution and is most evident frontally. Beta activity is closely linked to motor behavior and is generally attenuated during active movements. Low-amplitude beta with multiple and varying frequencies is often associated with active, busy or anxious thinking and active concentration. Rhythmic beta with a dominant set of frequencies is associated with various pathologies, such as Dup15q syndrome, and drug effects, especially benzodiazepines. It may be absent or reduced in areas of cortical damage. It is the dominant rhythm in patients who are alert or anxious or who have their eyes open.

Gamma waves

- Gamma is the frequency range approximately 30–100 Hz. Gamma rhythms are thought to represent binding of different populations of neurons together into a network for the purpose of carrying out a certain cognitive or motor function.
- Mu range is 8–13 Hz and partly overlaps with other frequencies. It reflects the synchronous firing of motor neurons in rest state. Mu suppression is thought to reflect motor mirror neuron systems, because when an action is observed, the pattern extinguishes, possibly because the normal and mirror neuronal systems "go out of sync" and interfere with one other.

"Ultra-slow" or "near-DC" activity is recorded using DC amplifiers in some research contexts. It is not typically recorded in a clinical context because the signal at these frequencies is susceptible to a number of artifacts.

Some features of the EEG are transient rather than rhythmic. Spikes and sharp waves may represent seizure activity or interictal activity in individuals with epilepsy or a predisposition toward epilepsy. Other transient features are normal: vertex waves and sleep spindles are seen in normal sleep.

There are types of activity that are statistically uncommon, but not associated with dysfunction or disease. These are often referred to as "normal variants". The mu rhythm is an example of a normal variant.

The normal electroencephalogram (EEG) varies by age. The prenatal EEG and neonatal EEG is quite different from the adult EEG. Fetuses in the third trimester and newborns display two common brain activity patterns: "discontinuous" and "trace alternant." "Discontinuous" electrical activity refers to sharp bursts of electrical activity followed by low frequency waves. "Trace alternant" electrical activity describes sharp bursts followed by short high amplitude intervals and usually indicates quiet sleep in newborns. The EEG in childhood generally has slower frequency oscillations than the adult EEG.

The normal EEG also varies depending on state. The EEG is used along with other measurements (EOG, EMG) to define sleep stages in polysomnography. Stage I sleep (equivalent to drowsiness in some systems) appears on the EEG as drop-out of the posterior basic rhythm. There can be an increase in theta frequencies. Santamaria and Chiappa cataloged a number of the variety of patterns associated with drowsiness. Stage II sleep is characterized by sleep spindles – transient runs of rhythmic activity in the 12–14 Hz range (sometimes referred to as the "sigma" band) that have a frontal-central maximum. Most of the activity in Stage II is in the 3–6 Hz range. Stage III and IV sleep are defined by the presence of delta frequencies and are often referred to collectively as "slow-wave sleep". Stages I–IV comprise non-REM (or "NREM") sleep. The EEG in REM (rapid eye movement) sleep appears somewhat similar to the awake EEG.

EEG under general anesthesia depends on the type of anesthetic employed. With halogenated anesthetics, such as halothane or intravenous agents, such as propofol, a rapid (alpha or low beta), nonreactive EEG pattern is seen over most of the scalp, especially anteriorly; in some older terminology this was known as a WAR (widespread anterior rapid) pattern, contrasted with a WAIS (widespread slow) pattern associated with high doses of opiates. Anesthetic effects on EEG signals are beginning to be understood at the level of drug actions on different kinds of synapses and the circuits that allow synchronized neuronal activity. Recent algorithms based on state-chart representation using EEG signals can now to monitor the brain states during general anesthesia allowing to classify the brain depth under various sedation.

== Artifacts ==
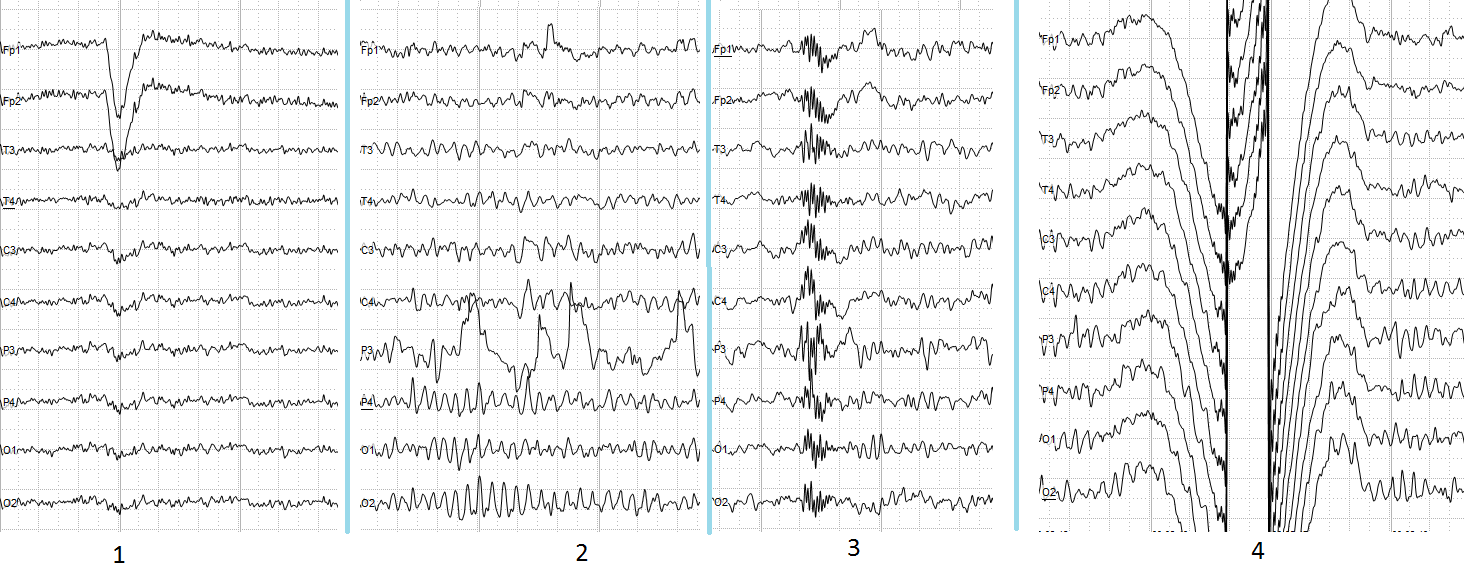
Main types of artifacts in human EEG

EEG is an extremely useful technique for studying brain activity, but the signal measured is always contaminated by artifacts which can impact the analysis of the data. An artifact is any measured signal that does not originate within the brain. Although multiple algorithms exist for the removal of artifacts, the problem of how to deal with them remains an open question. The source of artifacts can be from issues relating to the instrument, such as faulty electrodes, line noise or high electrode impedance, or they may be from the physiology of the subject being recorded. This can include, eye blinks and movement, cardiac activity and muscle activity and these types of artifacts are more complicated to remove. Artifacts may bias the visual interpretation of EEG data as some may mimic cognitive activity that could affect diagnoses of problems such as Alzheimer's disease or sleep disorders. As such the removal of such artifacts in EEG data used for practical applications is of the utmost importance.

=== Artifact removal ===
It is important to be able to distinguish artifacts from genuine brain activity in order to prevent incorrect interpretations of EEG data. General approaches for the removal of artifacts from the data are, prevention, rejection and cancellation. The goal of any approach is to develop methodology capable of identifying and removing artifacts without affecting the quality of the EEG signal. As artifact sources are quite different the majority of researchers focus on developing algorithms that will identify and remove a single type of noise in the signal. Simple filtering using a notch filter is commonly employed to reject components with a 50/60 Hz frequency. However such simple filters are not an appropriate choice for dealing with all artifacts, as for some, their frequencies will overlap with the EEG frequencies.

Regression algorithms have a moderate computation cost and are simple. They represented the most popular correction method up until the mid-1990s when they were replaced by "blind source separation" type methods. Regression algorithms work on the premise that all artifacts are comprised by one or more reference channels. Subtracting these reference channels from the other contaminated channels, in either the time or frequency domain, by estimating the impact of the reference channels on the other channels, would correct the channels for the artifact. Although the requirement of reference channels ultimately lead to this class of algorithm being replaced, they still represent the benchmark against which modern algorithms are evaluated. Blind source separation (BSS) algorithms employed to remove artifacts include principal component analysis (PCA) and independent component analysis (ICA) and several algorithms in this class have been successful at tackling most physiological artifacts. Recent real-time algorithms based on wavelet transport called wavelet quantile normalisation (WQN) can now be used to find and replace artifact segment in real-time in the absence of artifact information. These classes of algorithms depend on the continuity of spectral energy in the different frequency bands

=== Physiological artifacts ===
==== Ocular artifacts ====
Ocular artifacts affect the EEG signal significantly. This is due to eye movements involving a change in electric fields surrounding the eyes, distorting the electric field over the scalp, and as EEG is recorded on the scalp, it therefore distorts the recorded signal. A difference of opinion exists among researchers, with some arguing ocular artifacts are, or may be reasonably described as a single generator, whilst others argue it is important to understand the potentially complicated mechanisms. Three potential mechanisms have been proposed to explain the ocular artifact.

The first is corneal retinal dipole movement which argues that an electric dipole is formed between the cornea and retina, as the former is positively and the latter negatively charged. When the eye moves, so does this dipole which impacts the electrical field over the scalp, this is the most standard view. The second mechanism is retinal dipole movement, which is similar to the first but differing in that it argues there is a potential difference, hence dipole across the retina with the cornea having little effect. The third mechanism is eyelid movement. It is known that there is a change in voltage around the eyes when the eyelid moves, even if the eyeball does not. It is thought that the eyelid can be described as a sliding potential source and that the impacting of blinking is different to eye movement on the recorded EEG.

Eyelid fluttering artifacts of a characteristic type were previously called Kappa rhythm (or Kappa waves). It is usually seen in the prefrontal leads, that is, just over the eyes. Sometimes they are seen with mental activity. They are usually in the Theta (4–7 Hz) or Alpha (7–14 Hz) range. They were named because they were believed to originate from the brain. Later study revealed they were generated by rapid fluttering of the eyelids, sometimes so minute that it was difficult to see. They are in fact noise in the EEG reading, and should not technically be called a rhythm or wave. Therefore, current usage in electroencephalography refers to the phenomenon as an eyelid fluttering artifact, rather than a Kappa rhythm (or wave).

The propagation of the ocular artifact is impacted by multiple factors including the properties of the subject's skull, neuronal tissues and skin but the signal may be approximated as being inversely proportional to the distance from the eyes squared. The electrooculogram (EOG) consists of a series of electrodes measuring voltage changes close to the eye and is the most common tool for dealing with the eye movement artifact in the EEG signal.

==== Muscular artifacts ====
Another source of artifacts are various muscle movements across the body. This particular class of artifact is usually recorded by all electrodes on the scalp due to myogenic activity (increase or decrease of blood pressure). The origin of these artifacts have no single location and arises from functionally independent muscle groups, meaning the characteristics of the artifact are not constant. The observed patterns due to muscular artifacts will change depending on subject sex, the particular muscle tissue, and its degree of contraction. The frequency range for muscular artifacts is wide and overlaps with every classic EEG rhythm. However most of the power is concentrated in the lower range of the observed frequencies of 20 to 300 Hz making the gamma band particularly susceptible to muscular artifacts. Some muscle artifacts may have activity with a frequency as low as 2 Hz, so delta and theta bands may also be affected by muscle activity. Muscular artifacts may impact sleep studies, as unconscious bruxism (grinding of teeth) movements or snoring can seriously impact the quality of the recorded EEG. In addition the recordings made of epilepsy patients may be significantly impacted by the existence of muscular artifacts.

==== Cardiac artifacts ====
The potential due to cardiac activity introduces electrocardiograph (ECG) errors in the EEG. Artifacts arising due to cardiac activity may be removed with the help of an ECG reference signal.

==== Other physiological artifacts ====
Glossokinetic artifacts are caused by the potential difference between the base and the tip of the tongue. Minor tongue movements can contaminate the EEG, especially in parkinsonian and tremor disorders.

=== Environmental artifacts ===
In addition to artifacts generated by the body, many artifacts originate from outside the body. Movement by the patient, or even just settling of the electrodes, may cause electrode pops, spikes originating from a momentary change in the impedance of a given electrode. Poor grounding of the EEG electrodes can cause significant 50 or 60 Hz artifact, depending on the local power system's frequency. A third source of possible interference can be the presence of an IV drip; such devices can cause rhythmic, fast, low-voltage bursts, which may be confused for spikes.

== Abnormal activity ==
Abnormal activity can broadly be separated into epileptiform and non-epileptiform activity. It can also be separated into focal or diffuse.

Focal epileptiform discharges represent fast, synchronous potentials in a large number of neurons in a somewhat discrete area of the brain. These can occur as interictal activity, between seizures, and represent an area of cortical irritability that may be predisposed to producing epileptic seizures. Interictal discharges are not wholly reliable for determining whether a patient has epilepsy nor where his/her seizure might originate. (See focal epilepsy.)

Generalized epileptiform discharges often have an anterior maximum, but these are seen synchronously throughout the entire brain. They are strongly suggestive of a generalized epilepsy.

Focal non-epileptiform abnormal activity may occur over areas of the brain where there is focal damage of the cortex or white matter. It often consists of an increase in slow frequency rhythms or a loss of normal higher frequency rhythms. It may also appear as focal or unilateral decrease in amplitude of the EEG signal.

Diffuse non-epileptiform abnormal activity may manifest as diffuse abnormally slow rhythms or bilateral slowing of normal rhythms, such as the PBR.

Intracortical Encephalogram electrodes and sub-dural electrodes can be used in tandem to discriminate and discretize artifact from epileptiform and other severe neurological events.

More advanced measures of abnormal EEG signals have also recently received attention as possible biomarkers for different disorders such as Alzheimer's disease.

=== Remote communication ===
Systems for decoding imagined speech from EEG have applications such as in brain–computer interfaces.

=== EEG diagnostics ===
The Department of Defense (DoD) and Veteran's Affairs (VA), and U.S Army Research Laboratory (ARL), collaborated on EEG diagnostics in order to detect mild to moderate Traumatic Brain Injury (mTBI) in combat soldiers. Between 2000 and 2012, 75 percent of U.S. military operations brain injuries were classified mTBI. In response, the DoD pursued new technologies capable of rapid, accurate, non-invasive, and field-capable detection of mTBI to address this injury.

Combat personnel often develop PTSD and mTBI in correlation. Both conditions present with altered low-frequency brain wave oscillations. Altered brain waves from PTSD patients present with decreases in low-frequency oscillations, whereas, mTBI injuries are linked to increased low-frequency wave oscillations. Effective EEG diagnostics can help doctors accurately identify conditions and appropriately treat injuries in order to mitigate long-term effects.

Traditionally, clinical evaluation of EEGs involved visual inspection. Instead of a visual assessment of brain wave oscillation topography, quantitative electroencephalography (qEEG), computerized algorithmic methodologies, analyzes a specific region of the brain and transforms the data into a meaningful "power spectrum" of the area. Accurately differentiating between mTBI and PTSD can significantly increase positive recovery outcomes for patients especially since long-term changes in neural communication can persist after an initial mTBI incident.

Another common measurement made from EEG data is that of complexity measures such as Lempel-Ziv complexity, fractal dimension, and spectral flatness, which are associated with particular pathologies or pathology stages.

== Economics ==
Inexpensive EEG devices exist for the low-cost research and consumer markets. Recently, a few companies have miniaturized medical grade EEG technology to create versions accessible to the general public. Some of these companies have built commercial EEG devices retailing for less than US$100.

- In 2004 OpenEEG released its ModularEEG as open source hardware. Compatible open source software includes a game for balancing a ball.
- In 2007 NeuroSky released the first affordable consumer based EEG along with the game NeuroBoy. This was also the first large scale EEG device to use dry sensor technology.
- In 2008 OCZ Technology developed device for use in video games relying primarily on electromyography.
- In 2008 the Final Fantasy developer Square Enix announced that it was partnering with NeuroSky to create a game, Judecca.
- In 2009 Mattel partnered with NeuroSky to release the Mindflex, a game that used an EEG to steer a ball through an obstacle course. By far the best-selling consumer based EEG to date.
- In 2009 Uncle Milton Industries partnered with NeuroSky to release the Star Wars Force Trainer, a game designed to create the illusion of possessing the Force.
- In 2010, NeuroSky added a blink and electromyography function to the MindSet.
- In 2011, NeuroSky released the MindWave, an EEG device designed for educational purposes and games. The MindWave won the Guinness Book of World Records award for "Heaviest machine moved using a brain control interface".
- In 2012, a Japanese gadget project, neurowear, released Necomimi: a headset with motorized cat ears. The headset is a NeuroSky MindWave unit with two motors on the headband where a cat's ears might be. Slipcovers shaped like cat ears sit over the motors so that as the device registers emotional states the ears move to relate. For example, when relaxed, the ears fall to the sides and perk up when excited again.
- In 2014, OpenBCI released an eponymous open source brain-computer interface after a successful kickstarter campaign in 2013. The board, later renamed "Cyton", has 8 channels, expandable to 16 with the Daisy module. It supports EEG, EKG, and EMG. The Cyton Board is based on the Texas Instruments ADS1299 IC and the Arduino or PIC microcontroller, and initially cost $399 before increasing in price to $999. It uses standard metal cup electrodes and conductive paste.
- In 2015, Mind Solutions Inc released the smallest consumer BCI to date, the NeuroSync. This device functions as a dry sensor at a size no larger than a Bluetooth ear piece.
- In 2015, A Chinese-based company Macrotellect released BrainLink Pro and BrainLink Lite, a consumer grade EEG wearable product providing 20 brain fitness enhancement Apps on Apple and Android App Stores.
- In 2021, BioSerenity release the Neuronaute and Icecap a single-use disposable EEG headset that allows recording with equivalent quality to traditional cup electrodes.

== Future research ==
The EEG has been used for many purposes besides the conventional uses of clinical diagnosis and conventional cognitive neuroscience. An early use was during World War II by the U.S. Army Air Corps to screen out pilots in danger of having seizures; long-term EEG recordings in epilepsy patients are still used today for seizure prediction. Neurofeedback remains an important extension, and in its most advanced form is also attempted as the basis of brain computer interfaces. The EEG is also used quite extensively in the field of neuromarketing.

The EEG is altered by drugs that affect brain functions, the chemicals that are the basis for psychopharmacology. Berger's early experiments recorded the effects of drugs on EEG. The science of pharmaco-electroencephalography has developed methods to identify substances that systematically alter brain functions for therapeutic and recreational use.

Honda is attempting to develop a system to enable an operator to control its Asimo robot using EEG, a technology it eventually hopes to incorporate into its automobiles.

EEGs have been used as evidence in criminal trials in the Indian state of Maharashtra. Brain Electrical Oscillation Signature Profiling (BEOS), an EEG technique, was used in the trial of State of Maharashtra v. Sharma to show Sharma remembered using arsenic to poison her ex-fiancé, although the reliability and scientific basis of BEOS is disputed.

A lot of research is currently being carried out in order to make EEG devices smaller, more portable and easier to use. So called "Wearable EEG" is based upon creating low power wireless collection electronics and 'dry' electrodes which do not require a conductive gel to be used. Wearable EEG aims to provide small EEG devices which are present only on the head and which can record EEG for days, weeks, or months at a time, as ear-EEG. Such prolonged and easy-to-use monitoring could make a step change in the diagnosis of chronic conditions such as epilepsy, and greatly improve the end-user acceptance of BCI systems. Research is also being carried out on identifying specific solutions to increase the battery lifetime of Wearable EEG devices through the use of the data reduction approach.

In research, currently EEG is often used in combination with machine learning. EEG data are pre-processed then passed on to machine learning algorithms. These algorithms are then trained to recognize different diseases like schizophrenia, epilepsy or dementia. Furthermore, they are increasingly used to study seizure detection. By using machine learning, the data can be analyzed automatically. In the long run this research is intended to build algorithms that support physicians in their clinical practice and to provide further insights into diseases. In this vein, complexity measures of EEG data are often calculated, such as Lempel-Ziv complexity, fractal dimension, and spectral flatness. It has been shown that combining or multiplying such measures can reveal previously hidden information in EEG data.

EEG signals from musical performers were used to create instant compositions and one CD by the Brainwave Music Project, run at the Computer Music Center at Columbia University by Brad Garton and Dave Soldier. Similarly, an hour-long recording of the brainwaves of Ann Druyan was included on the Voyager Golden Record, launched on the Voyager probes in 1977, in case any extraterrestrial intelligence could decode her thoughts, which included what it was like to fall in love.

== History ==
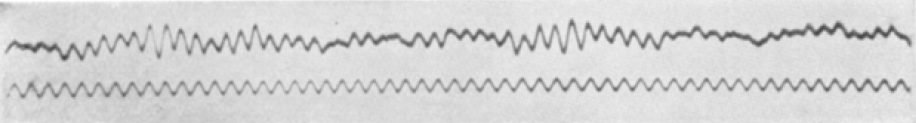
The first human EEG recording obtained by Hans Berger in 1924. The upper tracing is EEG, and the lower is a 10 Hz timing signal.

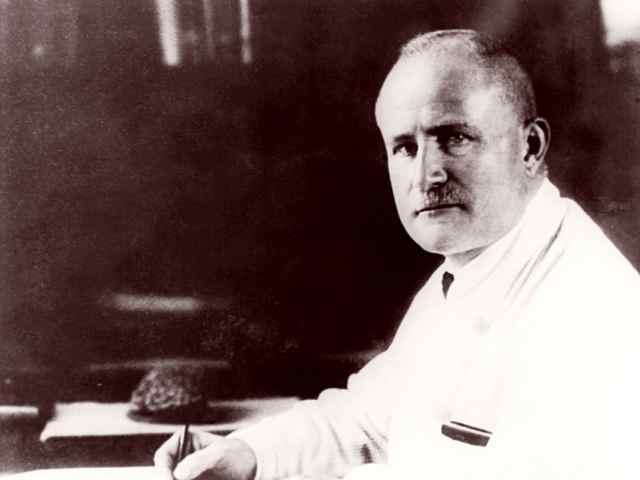
Hans Berger

In 1875, Richard Caton (1842–1926), a physician practicing in Liverpool, presented his findings about electrical phenomena of the exposed cerebral hemispheres of rabbits and monkeys in the British Medical Journal. In 1890, Polish physiologist Adolf Beck published an investigation of spontaneous electrical activity of the brain of rabbits and dogs that included rhythmic oscillations altered by light. Beck started experiments on the electrical brain activity of animals. Beck placed electrodes directly on the surface of the brain to test for sensory stimulation. His observation of fluctuating brain activity led to the conclusion of brain waves.

In 1912, Ukrainian physiologist Vladimir Vladimirovich Pravdich-Neminsky published the first animal EEG and the evoked potential of the mammalian (dog). In 1914, Napoleon Cybulski and Jelenska-Macieszyna photographed EEG recordings of experimentally induced seizures.

German physiologist and psychiatrist Hans Berger (1873–1941) recorded the first human EEG in 1924. Expanding on work previously conducted on animals by Richard Caton and others, Berger also invented the electroencephalograph (giving the device its name), an invention described "as one of the most surprising, remarkable, and momentous developments in the history of clinical neurology". His discoveries were first confirmed by British scientists Edgar Douglas Adrian and B. H. C. Matthews in 1934 and developed by them.

In 1934, Fisher and Lowenbach first demonstrated epileptiform spikes. In 1935, Gibbs, Davis and Lennox described interictal spike waves and the three cycles/s pattern of clinical absence seizures, which began the field of clinical electroencephalography. Subsequently, in 1936 Gibbs and Jasper reported the interictal spike as the focal signature of epilepsy. The same year, the first EEG laboratory opened at Massachusetts General Hospital.

Franklin Offner (1911–1999), professor of biophysics at Northwestern University developed a prototype of the EEG that incorporated a piezoelectric inkwriter called a Crystograph (the whole device was typically known as the Offner Dynograph).

In 1947, The American EEG Society was founded and the first International EEG congress was held. In 1953 Aserinsky and Kleitman described REM sleep.

In the 1950s, William Grey Walter developed an adjunct to EEG called EEG topography, which allowed for the mapping of electrical activity across the surface of the brain. This enjoyed a brief period of popularity in the 1980s and seemed especially promising for psychiatry. It was never accepted by neurologists and remains primarily a research tool.

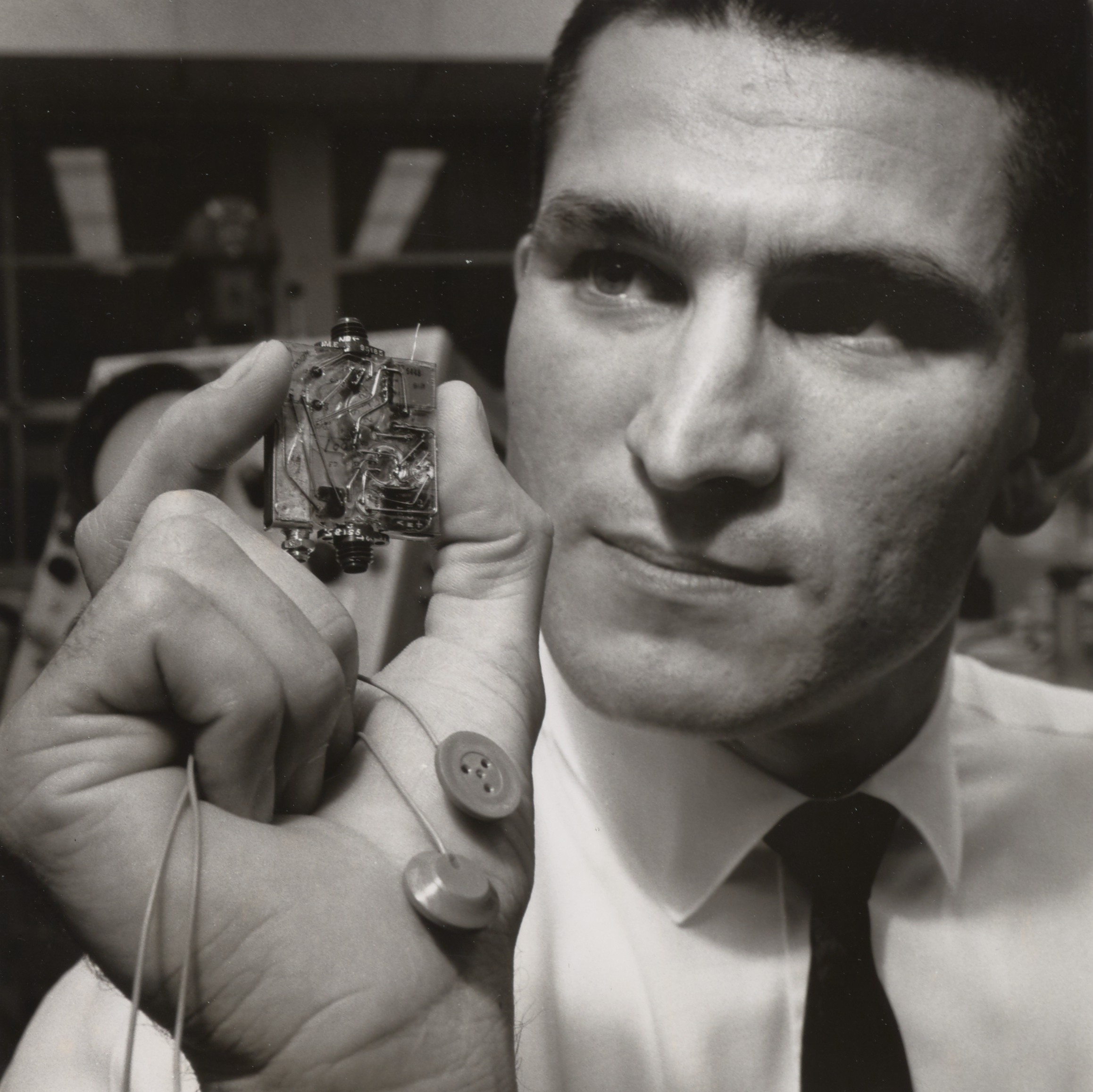
Chuck Kayser with electroencephalograph electrodes and a signal conditioner for use in Project Gemini, 1965

An electroencephalograph system manufactured by Beckman Instruments was used on at least one of the Project Gemini crewed spaceflights (1965–1966) to monitor the brain waves of astronauts on the flight. It was one of many Beckman Instruments specialized for and used by NASA.

The first instance of the use of EEG to control a physical object, a robot, was in 1988. The robot would follow a line or stop depending on the alpha activity of the subject. If the subject relaxed and closed their eyes therefore increasing alpha activity, the bot would move. Opening their eyes thus decreasing alpha activity would cause the robot to stop on the trajectory.

== See also ==
- Amplitude integrated electroencephalography
- Binaural beats
- Brainwave synchronization
- Cerebral function monitoring
- Comparison of consumer brain-computer interface devices
- Direct brain interfaces
- EEG analysis
- EEG measures during anesthesia
- EEG microstates
- Electromagnetic pulse
- Electroneurogram
- Electropalatograph
- Emotiv Systems
- European data format
- FieldTrip
- God helmet
- Hemoencephalography
- Hypersynchronization of electrophysiological activity in epilepsy
- Induced activity
- Michael Graham Saunders
- Mind machine
- Neural synchrony
- Ongoing brain activity
- Spontaneous potential
