= Fetal EEG =

- A group of active neurons create currents that can be recorded at the surface of the scalp using EEG.
- Synonyms: prenatal EEG

Fetal electroencephalography, also known as prenatal EEG includes any recording of electrical fluctuations arising from the brain of a fetus. Doctors and scientists use EEGs to detect and characterize brain activity, such as sleep states, potential seizures, or levels of a coma. EEG captures the electrical activity in the vicinity of the recording electrodes. The majority of the neural electrical activity arises from the flow of current from the cell bodies of pyramidal neurons to their apical dendrites, which become depolarized by excitatory inputs from other neurons. To record the most accurate signals, scientists try to minimize the distance between the recording electrode and the neural activity that they want to detect. Given the difficulty of attaching electrodes to a fetus inside a uterus, doctors and scientists use a variety of techniques to record fetal brain activity.

The three most common techniques for recording electrical brain activity before birth include:

- Attaching electrodes directly onto the fetus' scalp during surgical removal of the fetus
- Attaching electrodes on the maternal abdomen or cervix to record activity from the fetus in the third trimester
- Attaching electrodes to the scalp of an infant during labor and delivery.

The recording of the youngest fetus was performed between 43 and 45 days gestation and revealed some EEG features observed in newborns.

== History ==
In 1942, Dr. Lindsley recorded the first electrical activity from the brain of an unborn infant when he noticed that an electrical recording from his pregnant wife's lower abdomen resembled the electrical recordings from the scalp of a newborn. To follow up, in 1955, Bernstine, Borkowski and Price examined and described 32 fetal EEGs recorded from the maternal abdomen and cervix during labor. However, since scientists could not affix the electrodes to the fetus's scalp, continuous recordings were difficult to obtain. With the invention of suction cup electrodes, doctors could get continuous recordings from the same brain location during labor and delivery. From 1955 to 1976, many scientific groups made EEG recordings from electrodes placed on the maternal abdomen, or placed on the cervix using a speculum, and techniques continued improving.

In the 1980s, functional MRI or magnetoencephalography became the primary research tools for the prenatal study of human brain development; however, fetal EEG prevailed in clinical settings for determining sleep states in the unborn, or fetal distress.

== Fetal EEG patterns ==
Healthy newborns display two patterns of electrical activity described as "discontinuous" and "trace alternant" activity. "Discontinuous" electrical activity describes sharp bursts of electrical activity followed by low frequency waves; "trace alternant" electrical activity describes sharp bursts followed by short high amplitude intervals. Trace alternant activity has been correlated with quiet sleep. In the third trimester, normally developing fetuses show discontinuous and trace alternant patterns resembling those measured from normal newborns. Interestingly, as preterm infants advance in gestational age, the more likely they are to display low frequency waves and trace alternant activity; discontinuous activity becomes more rare the older a preterm infant is born.

== Techniques ==
=== Recordings from surgical termination of pregnancy ===
Between 1955 and 1961, Winslow Borkowski and Richard Bernstine, doctors at Jefferson Medical College Hospital, temporarily preserved tiny unborn fetuses removed during ectopic pregnancies and recorded from their brains. The team used needle electrodes to record brain activity at 3 millimeters and 1 centimeter below the brain surface. These electrodes penetrated the cranial tissue, which solves the problem of electrical interference from nearby muscles.

The youngest fetus that Borkowski and Bernstine studied was between 43 and 45 days post-conception – only 16mm long. At 45 days after conception, the brain is bent forward and is almost as large as the entire body of the fetus, allowing for these deep recordings. The 45-day-old fetus's electrical signals resembled the "discontinuous" patterns observed in healthy newborns, premature infants, and fetuses in the last trimester of pregnancy. The doctors also observed patterns that resembled "sleep spindles" in adults. The scientists continued recording until they consistently observed patterns of brain death, since the fetuses could not survive outside the uterus.

=== Recordings from the maternal abdomen ===
To record the most accurate brain signals, scientists try to minimize the distance between the recording electrode and fetal cortex by using an ultrasound to get the electrodes on the maternal abdomen as close to the fetal head as possible. The original fetal EEGs came from recordings through the maternal abdomen. However, electrical activity from the mother's heart, abdominal and uterine muscles all create artifacts in the fetal EEG recording. An artifact is electrical activity detected by the EEG that comes a source that the scientist does not want to measure. Muscles create electrical activity in the range of 20–100 Hz, and the uterine wall creates slow-wave activity and fast-wave activity related to the intrauterine pressure. Furthermore, the maternal heartbeat dominates recordings in every electrode and must be filtered out with computer algorithms.

Recordings from the maternal abdomen or cervix have less than 5 cm of tissue between the maternal skin and the fetal cortex. A typical human slow wave is 100-500 mV in amplitude, but the voltage strength declines with the square of the distance between the neural activity and the recording electrode. Even with modern techniques, scientists still have difficulties detecting brain activity recorded from outside the womb.

=== Recordings from the scalp during labor ===
Doctors can safely record EEG from the fetus without interference from the maternal heartbeat and uterine muscles by attaching suction-cup electrodes to the scalp of the unborn during labor and delivery. These electrodes are held in place using suction and can be applied as soon as a mother's amniotic membranes break and her cervix is dilated to 3 cm. The advantage of suction-cup electrodes are that they provide continuous recordings from the same fetal brain location, unlike electrodes on the maternal abdomen.

Both before and during labor, trace alternant patterns can be observed in the fetal EEG. The trace alternant pattern has been correlated with quiet sleep in newborn babies. During active REM sleep, EEG recordings from the fetus mostly show low voltage fast activity. During quiet non-REM sleep, EEG recordings from the fetus mostly show high voltage slow activity. Amazingly, the fetus spends most of the time of his labor and delivery asleep.
