= Erna Gibbs =

Pioneer of EEG (1904–1987)

Erna Gibbs in 1941

Erna Leonhardt-Gibbs (1904 – July 23, 1987) was a German pioneer in the development of electroencephalography (EEG) technology. She produced and maintained a library of over 100,000, thereby creating the first Atlas on Electroencephalography that enabled the correct classification of seizures.

== Research and career ==
In 1928, Erna Leonhardt left Germany and immigrated to the United States. She began work at Harvard University with Dr. William Lennox, measuring blood constituents in patients with epilepsy and normal controls, with Frederic Gibbs joining shortly afterward in 1929.

Erna and Frederic were married in 1930 (Erna becoming Erna Leonhardt-Gibbs), and worked collaboratively on projects thereafter.

In 1931, the Gibbses moved to the University of Pennsylvania to work for the Johnson Foundation. There, they worked together on a blood recorder machine and were the first to demonstrate that epileptic seizures were caused by electrical activity, and not a sudden loss of blood flow to the brain, as was the leading theory at the time.

Though the EEG was primitive in the 1930s, having only one channel, the Gibbses wanted to try recording in epilepsy patients. In 1935, they published the first paper on the EEG patterns of human epilepsy patients. Frederic Gibbs approached Albert Grass, who worked at MIT, about designing a three-channel EEG machine. That summer, the Gibbses attended the International Congress of Physiologists in Leningrad and Moscow, and visited Hans Berger, the inventor of the EEG. The three-channel EEG was finished by the time they returned, and they were able to advance their research further.

In the following years of research from 1935 to 1941, the Gibbses worked on creating the first Atlas on Electroencephalography, a manual on patterns to help other EEG researchers identify patterns. Erna Gibbs traced more than 100,000 EEGs for the atlas, and methodologically maintained the EEG and clinical records.

In 1944, the Gibbses moved to Chicago to work for the Illinois Neuropsychiatric Institute. Together, they established the Clinic for Epilepsy. Erna Gibbs began training technicians and scientists to read and record unipolar EEGs.

Frederic Gibbs won the Mead Johnson Award in 1939 for the Gibbses' work on the epilepsy blood recorder machine, and the Lasker Award in 1957 for their work on epilepsy. Erna Gibbs is not listed for either award, despite her contributions. She was named "Woman of the Year" by the American Women’s Association in 1958.

Gibbs died on July 23, 1987, at 83 years old.

== Publications ==
- Gibbs, Erna Leonhardt; Gibbs, Frederic A. (July 1934). "The cross section areas of the vessels that form the torcular and the manner in which flow is distributed to the right and to the left lateral sinus". The Anatomical Record. 59 (4): 419–426. doi:10.1002/ar.1090590404.
- "Atlas of electroencephalography / Vol. 2, Epilepsy | WorldCat.org". search.worldcat.org.
- Lennox, William G.; Gibbs, Erna Leonhardt (1 November 1932). "The Blood Flow in the Brain and the Leg of Man, and the Changes Induced by Alteration of Blood Gases 1". Journal of Clinical Investigation. 11 (6): 1155–1177. doi:10.1172/JCI100470. PMC 435872. PMID 16694095.
- Gibbs, F. A.; Gibbs, E. L.; Lennox, W. G. (1937). "Epilepsy: A Paroxysmal Cerebral Dysrhythmia". Brain. 60 (4): 377–388. doi:10.1093/brain/60.4.377.
- GALLAGHER, ROSWELL J. M.D.1; GIBBS, ERNA L.1; GIBBS, FREDERIC A. M.D.1. RELATION BETWEEN THE ELECTRICAL ACTIVITY OF THE CORTEX AND THE PERSONALITY IN ADOLESCENT BOYS. Psychosomatic Medicine 4(2):p 134-139, April 1942.
- Levinson, Julian D.; Gibbs, Erna L. (July 1982). "ELECTROENCEPHALOGRAM AND EYE DISORDERS : Clinical Correlation". 13 (3): 422–427. doi:10.1542/peds.7.3.422.
- Grossman, Herbert J.; Gibbs, Erna L. (1 October 1956). "Electroencephalographic Studies on Children Having Measles with No Clinical Evidence of Involvement of The Central Nervous System". American Academy of Pediatric. 18 (4): 556–560. doi:10.1542/peds.18.4.556.
- Gibbs, Frederic Andrews, and Erna L. (Erna Leonhardt) Gibbs. Medical Electroencephalography. Addison-Wesley Pub. Co., 1967.
- Gibbs, E. L.; Fleming, Marilyn M.; Gibbs, Frederic A. (1 January 1954). "Diagnosis and Prognosis of Hypsarhythmia and Infantile Spasms". Pediatrics. 13 (1): 66–73. doi:10.1542/peds.13.1.66. PMID 13133555.
- Gibbs, Erna L.; Gibbs, Frederic A. (January 1959). "Good Prognosis of Mid-Temporal Epilepsy". Epilepsia. 1 (1–5): 448–453. doi:10.1111/j.1528-1157.1959.tb04279.x. PMID 13827913.
- Gibbs, Erna L.; Gibbs, Frederic A. (7 December 1962). "Extreme Spindles: Correlation of Electroencephalographic Sleep Pattern with Mental Retardation". Science. 138 (3545): 1106–1107. Bibcode:1962Sci...138.1106G. doi:10.1126/science.138.3545.1106. PMID 13947675.
- Gibbs, Frederic A.; Gibbs, Erna L. (July 1977). "Electroencephalography in Post-Traumatic Medical Legal Cases". Clinical Electroencephalography. 8 (3): 156–164. doi:10.1177/155005947700800308.
- Gibbs, Erna L.; Gibbs, Frederic A. (July 1982). "Electroencephalographic Findings among Children with Head Injuries". Clinical Electroencephalography. 13 (3): 77–162. doi:10.1177/155005948201300308. PMID 6812998.
- Gibbs, Erna L.; Gibbs, Dr. Frederic A. (July 1989). "Psychomotor-Variant Type of Paroxysmal Cerebral Dysrhythmia". Clinical Electroencephalography. 20 (3): 52–147. doi:10.1177/155005948902000305. PMID 2502334.
