= Microstay =

Hotel residency periods of less than one night

Microstays are residency periods in a hotel room of less than a full night stay, choosing the check-in time and length of the stay in hours. Although such short stays have not been commonly offered by mainstream hotels in the Western hospitality industry, doing so emerged as a trend in the World Travel Market Global Trends Report 2013. Bookings for less than a full night stay became more popular in Europe as a way to increase revenue by offering greater flexibility. By offering microstays, hotels can take advantage of their available inventory and sometimes sell the same room twice in a day.

== See also ==
- ByHours and Dayuse.com – Two microstay booking services
- Day room (hotel) – Hotel bookings for brief stays especially for daytime use or layovers near airports and cruise ship ports
- Love hotel – Hotels catering to microstay clients for sexual encounters
