= Bioserenity =

French healthcare company

BioSerenity
- Type: Privately held company
- Industry: research and development in biotechnology
- Founded: January 29, 2014
- Founder: Pierre-Yves Frouin
- Headquarters: Paris, France
- Area served: US, France, Germany
- Key people: Emmanuel Mougeotte (CEO)
- Products: Neuronaute, Cardionaute, Cardioskin
- Services: Neurophy, Cardiophy, Somnophy
- Website: www.bioserenity.ai

BioSerenity is a medtech company created in 2014 that develops ambulatory medical devices to help diagnose and monitor patients with chronic diseases such as epilepsy. The medical devices are composed of medical sensors, smart clothing or consumables, a smartphone app for Patient Reported Outcome, and a web platform to perform data analysis through Medical Artificial Intelligence for detection of digital biomarkers. The company initially focused on Neurology, a domain in which it reported contributing to the diagnosis of 30 000 patients per year. It now also operates in Sleep Disorders and Cardiology. BioSerenity reported it provides pharmaceutical companies with solutions for companion diagnostics.

== Company history ==
BioSerenity was founded in 2014, by Pierre-Yves Frouin. The company was initially hosted at the ICM Institute (Institute du Cerveau et de la Moëlle épinière), in Paris, France.

In 2015, the company raised a €3M seed round with Kurma Partners and IdInvest Partners.

In 2017 BioSerenity raised a €15M series A round with LBO France, IdInvest Partners and BPI France,

A €50M series B was announced in 2019, followed by the acquisition of the American Company SleepMed and Novasom. At the time, the company was working with over 200 Hospitals.

In 2020, during the COVID pandemic, BioSerenity was one of the five French manufacturers (Savoy, BB Distrib, Celluloses de Brocéliande, Chargeurs) working on the production of sanitary equipment including FFP2 masks at request of the French government.

In 2021, the Neuronaute was used by approximately 30,000 patients per year.

In 2023, BioSerenity went through a judicial reorganization proceedings (redressement judiciaire) which concluded with a sale plan in favour of private equity firm Jolt Capital, which announced a €24M investment. Operations continued under the new ownership and the company launched the Icecap, a single use EEG solution and its A.I. model for Sleep Disorders with teams from Stanford University.

By 2025, the company was performing more than 45,000 EEGs (electroencephalograms), 8,000 PSGs (polysomnographies), and 5,000 ECGs (electrocardiograms) each year. The company launched a new EEG A.I. model and signed an agreement to distribute its solutions in the USA through Stratus.

In November 2025, Emmanuel Mougeotte, former CEO of CompuGroup Medical France, became CEO of the company and in January 2026, Pierre-Yves Frouin, founder of BioSerenity concluded his tenure and exited the company.

In March 2026, the company opened an affiliate in Germany. The company was named one of the World's Top HealthTech Companies by Time magazine.

== Awards ==
- Disrupt 100
- French Next40
- Selected by Microsoft and AstraZeneca in their initiative AI Factory for Health
- Stanford's University StartX program
- World's Top HealthTech companies of 2026 by Time Magazine.
