= Amplitude integrated electroencephalography =

Technique for monitoring brain function in intensive care settings

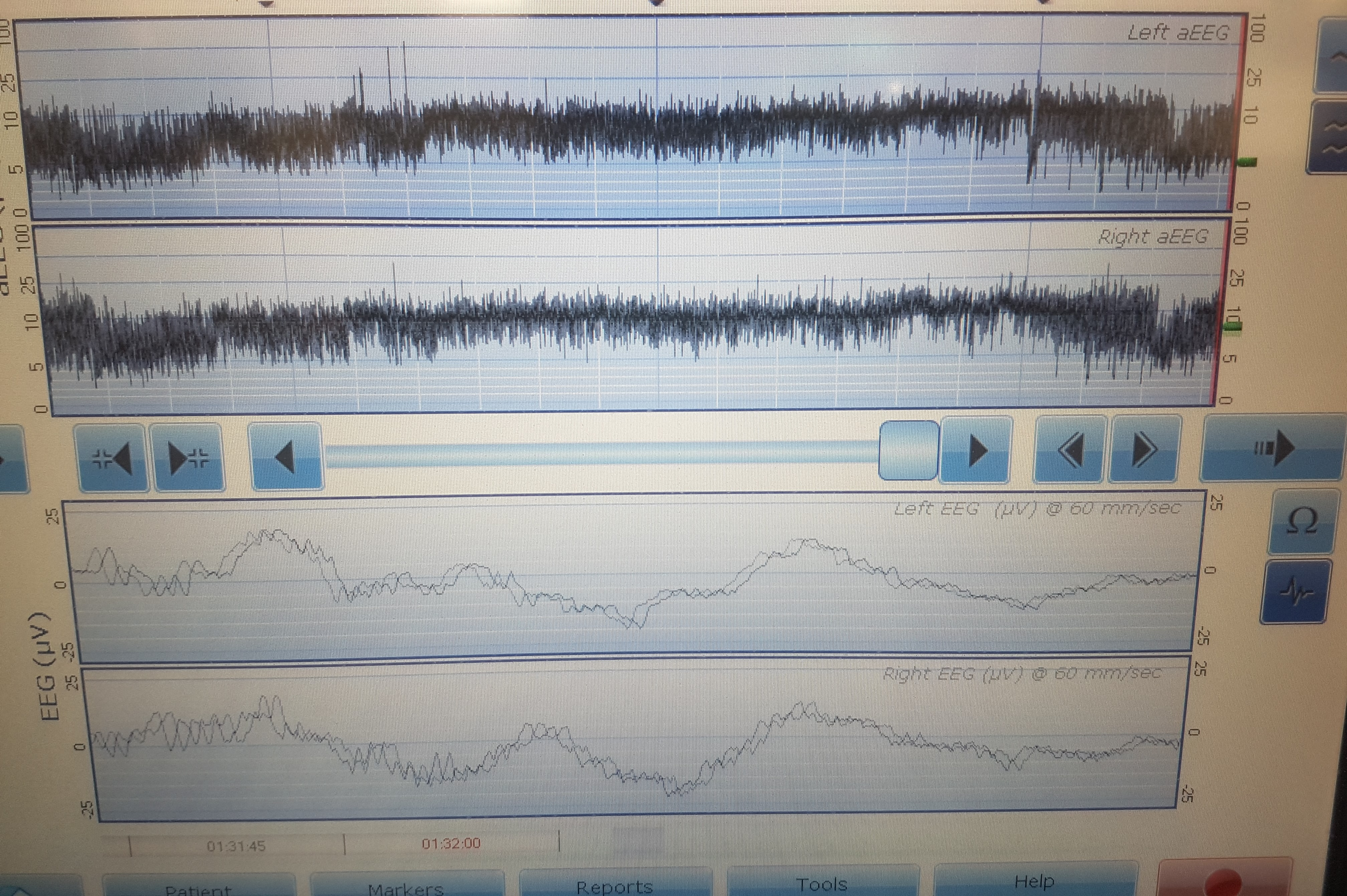
- A normal CFM trace in a term infant who is several days old. The amplitude-integrated trace is in the top half of the screen displaying left- and right-sided traces. There is a normal baseline and upper limit, sleep-wake cycling, and no seizures.
- Purpose: monitoring brain function in intensive care

Amplitude integrated electroencephalography (aEEG), cerebral function monitoring (CFM) or continuous electroencephalogram (CEEG) is a technique for monitoring brain function in intensive care settings over longer periods of time than the traditional electroencephalogram (EEG), typically hours to days. By placing electrodes on the scalp of the patient, a trace of electrical activity is produced, which is then displayed on a semilogarithmic graph of peak-to-peak amplitude over time; amplitude is logarithmic and time is linear. In this way, trends in electrical activity in the cerebral cortex can be interpreted to inform on events such as seizures or suppressed brain activity. aEEG is useful especially in neonatology where it can be used to aid in diagnosis of hypoxic ischemic encephalopathy (HIE), and to monitor and diagnose seizure activity.

== Interpretation of the aEEG ==
The CFM readout offers an integrated trace in one pane and a non-integrated trace in another pane (see image). Modern machines give a readout for each hemisphere corresponding to the positions of electrodes placed on the patient's head. The characteristics of the CFM include the 'baseline', which should be more than 5 μV, the upper limit of the trace, which should be more than 10 μV, and the presence of 'sleep wake cycling' whereby the trace is expected to narrow and broaden over time. Seizures appear on the trace as regions of high activity with a raised and compacted trace in the aEEG pane; this would correspond to high-amplitude, repetitive waveforms in the non-integrated pane. A low-amplitude or 'suppressed' trace is prognostically concerning as it indicates abnormally low brain activity. A further possible pattern is a 'burst suppression' trace, which consists of a low-amplitude signal interspersed with periods of high activity on the aEEG readout. This also carries a poor prognosis.

== See also ==
- Electroencephalogram(EEG)
- Bispectral index
- Epileptic seizure
- Hypoxic ischaemic encephalopathy
- Therapeutic hypothermia
- Pressure reactivity index
- Neonatal seizure
