= Electroneurogram =

Medical technique

An electroneurogram is a method used to visualize directly recorded electrical activity of neurons in the central nervous system (brain, spinal cord) or the peripheral nervous system (nerves, ganglions). The acronym ENG is often used. An electroneurogram is similar to an electromyogram (EMG), but the latter is used to visualize muscular activity. An electroencephalogram (EEG) is a particular type of electroneurogram in which several electrodes are placed around the head and the general activity of the brain is recorded, without having very high resolution to distinguish between the activity of different groups of neurons.

An electroneurogram is usually obtained by placing an electrode in the neural tissue. The electrical activity generated by neurons is recorded by the electrode and transmitted to an acquisition system, which usually allows to visualize the activity of the neuron. Each vertical line in an electroneurogram represents one neuronal action potential. Depending on the precision of the electrode used to record neural activity, an electroneurogram can contain the activity of a single neuron to thousands of neurons. Researchers adapt the precision of their electrode to either focus on the activity of a single neuron or the general activity of a group of neurons, both strategies having their advantages.
