= Michael Graham Saunders =

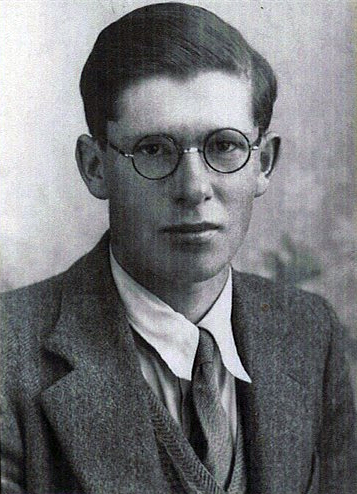
- Michael Graham Saunders, ca. 1950
- Born: 6 November 1920; London, England
- Died: 4 March 1975 (aged 54); Minneapolis, Minnesota, US
- Citizenship: English, later Canadian
- Spouse: Leonore Gladwell
- Scientific career
- Fields: Electroencephalography, Computer science

Michael Graham Saunders (11 June 1920 – 3 April 1975) was a Neurophysiologist, Medical Doctor, and Medical Researcher who was fundamental in the development of the Electroencephalography, as well as a strong advocate for the advancement of computer use in medicine.

== Early years ==
He was born in London, England, to Eric Graham Saunders and Rose Kate Gasson, and received his early education at Launceston College, Cornwall. He then attended Victoria University of Manchester, attaining a BSc in 1940 in anatomy and physiology ]; MB ChB 1944; MSc 1944 in physiology (medical electronics) and MD (by published papers) in 1964.

== Career ==
Dr. and Mrs. Saunders left England and came to Winnipeg, Manitoba in April 1949. He was appointed assistant professor of Physiology specializing in Neurophysiology at the University of Manitoba, and also Director of the Electroencephalography Departments of the Winnipeg General Hospital and Children's Hospital and consultant EEG Services to the Department of Health, Province of Manitoba and to the St. Boniface General Hospital (Winnipeg).

As his wife was a graduate physiotherapist, Dr. Saunders' early interests in this area led to an appointment as Director of the Electromyography department of the Manitoba Rehabilitation Hospital (now the Rehabilitation Centre).

In 1941 he was a founder member of the EEG Society (U.K.); a member of the Neurological Club, National Hospital, Queen's Square, London; and upon settling in Winnipeg he joined the comparable societies in Canada and the United States, being a founder member of the Canadian Society of EEG. He held executive positions in several organizations. He was an honorary member of the Canadian Physiotherapy Association; the Canadian Association of EEG Technicians; a member of the University of Manitoba Committee for Safety in Experimental Deprivation; a member of the council and an examiner for the American Board of Registration of EEG technologists; examiner for the Board of Qualification, American EEG Society; secretary and later president, Canadian Society of Electroencephalographers; president and member of Council of the Central EEG Society (U.S.); president (Manitoba Chapter) and delegate (National Society) of the Computer Society of Canada. He was also Procedural Counselor, delegate-at-large, and Chairman of the Rules Committee for the Vienna meeting of the International Federation of Societies for Encephalography and Clinical Physiology (IFECN). Saunders was also a founding member of the Canadian Board of Registration of Electroencephalograph Technologists, founded in 1972.

He died on April 4, 1975.
