= Idinvest Partners =

- Company type: Limited company with a board of directors
- Industry: Private equity
- Headquarters: Paris, France
- Number of employees: +90
- Website: idinvest.com

Idinvest Partners, founded under the name AGF Private Equity, S.A in 1997, is a European private equity and venture capital firm. Operating as part of Allianz until 2010, Idinvest Partners then became independent. Idinvest Partners is based in Paris, France and has further offices in Frankfurt (Germany), Dubai, Madrid, Spain and Shanghai, China.

Since its inception, Idinvest Partners has invested in more than 4,000 European businesses. With an excess of €8 billion in assets under management, Idinvest Partners focuses on the financing of small and medium-sized European enterprises at various stages of growth.

Idinvest Partners has been named Best Private Equity Team (Deloitte 2012 Technology Fast 50 Award) and awarded The French LP Gold Award 2012 at Private Equity Exchange.

== History ==
Idinvest was founded in 1997 by AGF (Allianz) as AGF Private Equity.

In 2015, Idinvest Partners closed its second SME senior debt fund, Idinvest Dette Senior II (IDS II), at €400 million.

In 2017, the Frankfurt office and Shanghai office was launched. Idinvest Partners awarded private debt mandate by France's Fonds de Réserve pour les Retraites (FRR) and launches a new vehicle to finance industrial assets.

In February 2018, the private equity firm Eurazeo agreed to acquire a majority stake in Idinvest Partners, creating a private equity firm with more than $15 billion in assets., In May 2018 Idinvest Partners closed its fourth direct lending fund, Idinvest Private Debt IV at €715 million.

== Portfolio ==
Idinvest Partners have financed businesses at various stages of growth. Idinvest has a particular focus on the IT sector, which include Deezer, Criteo, Happn, Dailymotion, Sigfox, and others. IdInvest have artificial intelligence companies in their portfolio, such as Neurala, an AI start-up with ties to NASA, Stanley Robotics, a robotic valet service and Clustree, an AI powered recruitment service. Fintech investments are also included, with Kantox, a currency and risk management services company and biotech and health investments, with DNA Script, a synthetic DNA manufacturer.
