= Neural binding =

Neurological ramifications of and for the Binding Problem in the study of consciousness

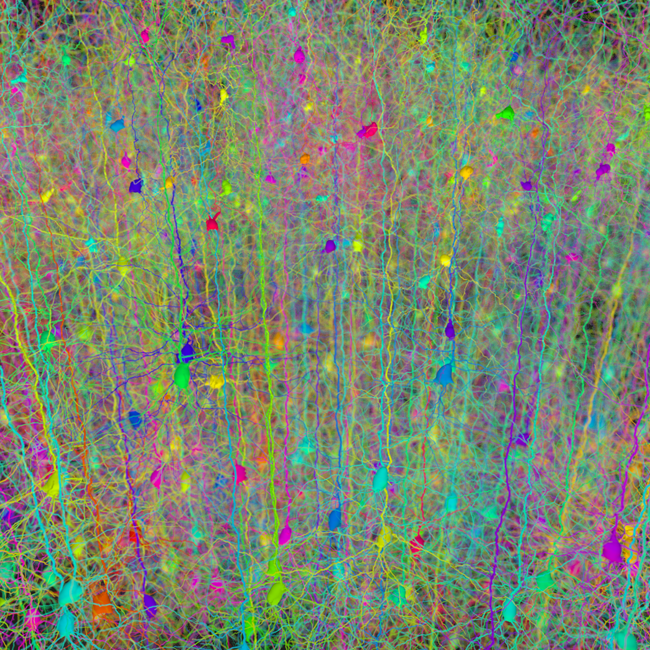
Neural binding involves the complex coordination of diverse neural circuits

Neural binding is the neuroscientific aspect of what is commonly known as the binding problem: the interdisciplinary difficulty of creating a comprehensive and verifiable model for the unity of consciousness. "Binding" refers to the integration of highly diverse neural information in the forming of one's cohesive experience. The neural binding hypothesis states that neural signals are paired through synchronized oscillations of neuronal activity that combine and recombine to allow for a wide variety of responses to context-dependent stimuli. These dynamic neural networks are thought to account for the flexibility and nuanced response of the brain to various situations. The coupling of these networks is transient, on the order of milliseconds, and allows for rapid activity.

A viable mechanism for this phenomenon must address (1) the difficulties of reconciling the global nature of the participating (exogenous) signals and their relevant (endogenous) associations, (2) the interface between lower perceptual processes and higher cognitive processes, (3) the identification of signals (sometimes referred to as “tagging”) as they are processed and routed throughout the brain, and (4) the emergence of a unity of consciousness.

Proposed adaptive functions of neural binding have included the avoidance of hallucinatory phenomena generated by endogenous patterns alone as well as the avoidance of behavior driven by involuntary action alone.

There are several difficulties that must be addressed in this model. First, it must provide a mechanism for the integration of signals across different brain regions (both cortical and subcortical). It must also be able to explain the simultaneous processing of unrelated signals that are held separate from one another and integrated signals that must be viewed as a whole.

== Interdisciplinary correlates ==
The study of the binding problem in neuroscience stems from the much older psychological study of the binding phenomenon, which has its roots in the ancient philosophical study of the same problems. Today, there is a close interplay between neuroscience and psychology, which is especially relevant to neural binding.

=== Gestalt psychology and correlating critiques ===
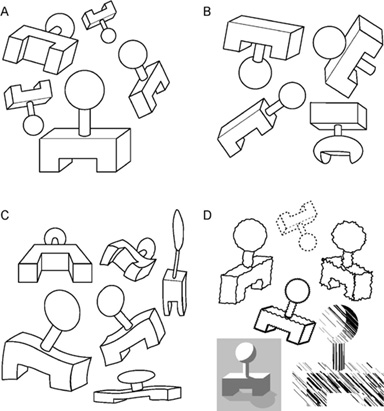
Representation of the multiple ways to perceive the same object

Gestalt psychology is a field that has been intertwined with neural binding due to its advances in conceptualizing how the brain views objects, reacts to stimuli, and then reacts on a global level. Since Gestalt Psychology has become so involved, “grouping” has become an important part of understanding neural binding. The scientists that supported this theory were solely focused on the idea that mechanisms in the brain operated preattentively.

"Grouping" has become especially important for neural binding due to studies in gamma wave activity in the brain. From single-unit recording scientists have been able to measure the oscillatory neuronal activity and have been able to better their understanding of the grouping or pairing of neurons. Thus, these pairings connect with Gestalt psychology and its theory that objects are seen independently of their separate pieces, in a more global manner. A study done by Gray, Konig, Engel and Singer in 1989 reported that when studying visual cortex cells, light moving in opposite directions had low relation to one another. Yet when the light rays were then pointed in the same direction, the correlative relationship was stronger. A paper addressing this idea states, "Thus, correlated activity was only obtained when cells responded to different aspects of the same 'Gestalt'". Other studies using EEGs from the human scalp also examined gamma wave activity, showing how stimuli seemed to be in accordance with preattentive binding.

By contrast with this, another group of scientists (Treisman & Gelade) believed that the mechanisms did not work preattentively. They postulated that in order to make correct bindings there had to be attention. Hence, they called their theory "attentional binding." The idea of attentional binding is that, as someone places their attention on an object with multiple features, they develop over time a coherent representation of that object and the characteristics that it holds. These characteristics, after being processed through attention, can be stored in short-term memory or as episodic memories.

One more contrast to Gestalt psychological emphasis in neural binding was brought up by L. Chen. Chen asserts that the local-global idea of Gestalt does not suffice in explaining neural processing. Instead, Chen uses the idea that perception depends on "topological invariants that describe the geometrical potentiality of the entire stimulus configuration". The idea here is that looking at a certain object creates a stimulus which in turn fires a constellation of that object, and then the object becomes recognized.

The rebuttal to Chen's idea is that since each object has its own constellation, as well as its own particular set of neurons, there would not be enough space in the brain for all the appropriate neuronal pathways. This ratio of 1:1 simply could not support the many complex mechanisms of the human brain.

Later, more writings were produced regarding preattentive binding. Although they did not focus as much on Gestalt psychology, they were important to the idea of the preattentiveness of the brain. One such addition onto this theory was put out by Duncan and Humphreys. They said that some types of features, when trying to form the image, compete against one another for "the limited capacity object recognition stage". This means that certain parts of an object have multiple ways of being featured by the brain. Each different type of feature then competes with the others, trying to become the feature that is displayed to the individual. This can then account for the understanding of how each person views a whole object differently than another person. They also then see its global function on a very different scale.

This idea of differential grouping is also brought up by Aksentijevic, Elliott, and Barber. Their theory is based on different perceptions of geometrical space that can then supply a "starting point for a systematic exploration of the subjective properties of certain classes of visual and auditory grouping phenomena, such as apparent motion, grouping within static two-dimensional displays and auditory streaming." This idea shows how different people perceive geometrical space, which can lead to different auditory and visual streams.

== Proposed models ==
=== Temporal ===
Some trajectories of a harmonic oscillator. The Temporal Binding Hypothesis and other areas of neural binding use this idea to describe the pairing of two oscillating waves, forming an image.

The Temporal Binding Hypothesis has a history in neuroscience which spans back to at least the early 1980s. Christoph Von der Malsburg proposed that neurons carry two distinct signals, one of conventional rate code in relation to the ‘effectiveness’ of the feature it is encoding and another which is conveyed in terms of spike coordination between assemblies of neurons. A decade later Francis Crick & Christof Koch developed the model further by explaining the synchronization of distant neurons by transient gamma wave oscillations being guided by attention. By 1995, Francisco Varela had established the importance of the role of the oscillatory phase in the pairing of neuron assemblies.

The Temporal Binding Hypothesis was first proposed as a way of addressing the combinatorial problem of neural binding, which emphasizes the impossibly large number of connections that would have to be made between neurons of overlapping function and association in order to achieve the degree of observable complexity in neural binding. Modern models that are currently being developed often retain the structure of temporal synchrony due to this significant advantage as well as the strong experimental support for the existence of global brain oscillations.

==== Gamma band activity ====
Gamma waves recorded from an EEG

It has been widely observed that distributed collections of neurons oscillate within the gamma band of frequencies (typically between 30–80 Hz)..

==== Phasic pairing mechanisms ====
Varela’s model describes the selection of cellular assemblies, sometimes referred to as resonant or reverberating (Lorente de Nó) circuits, as being integrated into a larger ensemble by transient spike phase locking. This addresses the explanatory difficulty of the simultaneous nature of binding because it allows many signals to be in transit in parallel within an overlapping frequency range without interference.

==== Criticism ====
The temporal binding models have been criticized by some for being unwarranted in their far-reaching speculative nature. This claim is usually made in favor of a more classical model of neural function.

=== Quantum models ===
The NMDA receptor acts as a coincidence detector that requires the binding of multiple ligands (e.g., glutamate and glycine, as depicted here) for activation.

Some more recent models have incorporated quantum theory as a component of the underlying neural dynamics behind binding due to the strong explanatory power of quantum mechanics and their claim of the insufficiency of current models for explaining the complexity of the binding mechanism.

In 2001, da Rocha developed a model which utilized the basic structure of the Temporal Binding Hypothesis, with global phase synchronization being a primary mechanism of distributing information, but emphasized the importance of a quantum computation performed on a local level. His model depicts the NMDA receptor as the coincidence detector proposed in other theories. This is a physiological mechanism which has been criticized for being absent from a full theory of temporal binding previously.

==== Catecholaminergic Neuron Electron Transport (CNET) ====
A neural signaling mechanism in certain catecholaminergic neurons has been hypothesized that uses quantum mechanical electron transport (Catecholaminergic Neuron Electron Transport, or CNET). The hypothesis is based in part on the observation by many independent researchers that electron tunneling occurs in ferritin (an iron storage protein that is prevalent in those neurons) at room temperature and ambient conditions. The function of this mechanism would be to assist in action selection, but the mechanism itself would be capable of integrating millions of cognitive and sensory neural signals, using a physical mechanism associated with strong electron-electron interactions. The hypothesis predicted a number of physical properties of these neurons that have been subsequently observed experimentally, such as electron tunneling in substantia nigra pars compacta (SNc) tissue and the presence of disordered arrays of ferritin in SNc tissue. The hypothesis also predicted that disordered ferritin arrays like those found in SNc tissue should be capable of supporting long-range electron transport and providing a switching or routing function, both of which have been subsequently observed.

CNET also predicted that the largest SNc neurons should mediate action selection. This prediction was contrary to earlier proposals about the function of those neurons that were based on predictive reward dopamine signaling. However, a team led by Dr. Pascal Kaiser of Harvard Medical School subsequently demonstrated that those neurons code movement, consistent with the earlier predictions of CNET. While the CNET mechanism has not yet been directly observed, it may be possible to do so using quantum dot fluorophores tagged to ferritin or other analytical techniques for detecting electron tunneling.

=== Non-synchronous models ===
Many non-temporal theories attempt to retain a more classical conception of neuron signaling based on hierarchical structures. This relies on the convergence of signals upon specific neural circuits as well as the dynamic routing of signaling pathways through specialized computational sub-assemblies.

These models can be vulnerable to the combinatorial and connectivity problems, which come as a natural consequence of depending solely on one-to-one communication of conventional information via spike rate coding. These models also require the seamless directing and combining of signals, which either assumes a controller (proposed to be the pulvinar nuclei) or a mechanism for the spontaneous self-assembly of neural ensembles.

== Test cases ==
=== Sensory ===
Much of the experimental evidence for neural binding has traditionally revolved around sensory awareness. Sensory awareness is accomplished by integrating things together by cognitively perceiving them and then segmenting them so that, in total, there is an image created. Since there can be an infinite number of possibilities in the perception of an object, this has been a unique area of study. The way the brain then collectively pieces certain things together via networking is important not only in the global way of perceiving but also in segmentation. Much of sensory awareness has to do with the taking of a single piece of an object's makeup and then binding its total characteristics so that the brain perceives the object in its final form.

Much of the research for the understanding of segmentation and how the brain perceives an object has been done by studying cats. A major finding of this research has to do with the understanding of gamma waves oscillating at 40 Hz. The information was extracted from a study using the cat visual cortex. It was shown that the cortical neurons responded differently to spatially different objects. These firings of neurons ranged from 40–60 Hz in measure and when observed showed that they fired synchronously when observing different parts of the object. Such coherent responses point to the fact that the brain is doing a kind of coding where it is piecing certain neurons together in the works of making the form of an object. Since the brain is putting these segmented pieces together unsupervised, a significant consonance is found with many philosophers (like Sigmund Freud) who theorize an underlying subconscious that helps to form every aspect of our conscious thought processes.

In order for these multiple firings from multiple areas to be combined into a specific extrinsic event, there must be help from the dorsal thalamus. It is not proven whether the dorsal thalamus is the primary organizer, but it does fit the specific profile for collecting neuronal activity and rapidly coordinating between what is happening in the brain and outside of it. The space in and around the dorsal thalamus, the thalamocortical area, is able to generate fast voltage-dependent membrane potential oscillations which allow it to react quickly to received messages. The types of channels that cover this area are presumed to be GABAergic. Since sensory awareness needs to be quick, the threshold for sodium and potassium in this area is quite low.

=== Cognitive ===
Francis Crick and Christof Koch proposed that specific neural activity can stimulate short-term memory, forming a continuous and dynamic consciousness.

Cognitive binding is associated with the different states of human consciousness. Two of the most studied states of consciousness are the wakefulness and REM sleep. There have been multiple studies showing, electrophysiologically, that these two states are quite similar in nature. This has led some neural binding theorists to study the modes of cognitive awareness in each state. Certain observations have even led these scientists to hypothesize that since there is little cognition going on during REM sleep, the increased thalamocortical responses show the action of processing in the waking preconscious.

The thalamus and cortex are important anatomical features in cognitive and sensory awareness. The understanding of how these neurons fire and relate to one other in each of these states (REM and Waking) is paramount to understanding awareness and its relation to neural binding.

In the waking state, neuronal activity in animals is subject to changes based on the current environment. Changes in environment act as a form of stress on the brain so that when sensory neurons are then fired synchronously, they acclimate to the new state. This new state can then be moved to the hippocampus where it can be stored for later use. In the words of James Newman and Anthony A. Grace in their article, "Binding Across Time" this idea is put forth: "The hippocampus is the primary recipient of inferotemporal outputs and is known to be the substrate for the consolidation of working memories to long term, episodic memories."

The logging of "episodes" is then used for "streaming", which can mediate by the selective gating of certain information reentering sensory awareness. Streaming and building of episodic memories would not be possible if neural binding did not unconsciously connect the two synchronous oscillations.

The pairing of these oscillations can then help input the correct sensory material. If these paired oscillations are not new, then cognitively these firings will be easily understood. If there are new firings, the brain will have to acclimate to the new understanding.

In REM sleep, the only extreme difference from the waking state is that the brain does not have the actual waking amount of sensory firings, so cognitively, there is not as much awareness here, although the activity of the "brain’s eye" is still quite significant and very similar to the waking state. Studies have shown that during sleep there are still 40 Hz Oscillation firings. These firings are due to the perceived stimuli happening in dreams. "

=== Learning/memory ===
Opitz argues that the binding of different brain areas is mediated by the hippocampus. Relational bindings, or relationships between separate objects, concepts, and memories, are very flexible because the targets can be combined in so many different ways to deal with the present situation, and the hippocampus ensures that these parts are arranged into a coherent whole. Particularly, the hippocampus has been implicated in binding that is involved with episodic memory, working memory, and language acquisition. According to Opitz, this is viable because the hippocampus meets all criteria to be suitable for the regulation relational binding and, based on its patterns of activity, it is likely that it is involved.

== Clinical implications ==
=== Autism ===
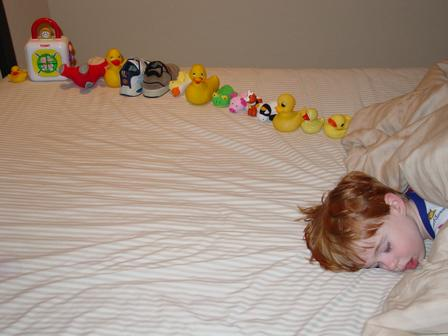
A young boy with autism who has arranged his toys in a row

Several researchers have suggested a clinical link between difficulties in neural binding and autism spectrum disorders. It has been postulated that there is a level of underconnectivity between certain areas of the autistic brain, specifically those areas that involve social cognition. They also hypothesize that there may be overconnectivity within certain neuronal cell assemblies. Researchers have suggested that these issues with coherence of neural networks give rise to the hallmark autistic symptoms, namely, impaired social cognition/interactions and repetitive behaviors.

There is one major piece of evidence suggesting that abnormal connectivity occurs in autism. Autistic brains are known to develop very rapidly early in life, and this could cause problems in the development of cortical connections. It has been suggested that this early overdevelopment may be a cause for the impaired connectivity in autism. Diffusion tensor imaging studies of autistic brains are consistent with this idea, as they show reduced myelination (see:Myelin) in the areas of the brain that deal with social cognition and theory of mind, or one’s ability to comprehend what another person may be thinking. This provides further evidence for underconnectivity of the autistic brain.

=== Schizophrenia ===
It is also possible that problems with binding give way to the fractured mental state that is characteristic of schizophrenia. Schizophrenic patients experience a “disintegration of consciousness” which involves hallucinations, delusions, and generally disordered thinking. It is hypothesized that this mental disorganization is caused by underlying neural disorganization due to disordered binding, which is then further complicated by the occurrence of complex mental processes in this disordered state. This can essentially be viewed as a pathological rise in the neural complexity of the brain. The dissociative symptoms and disorganized speech associated with schizophrenia are consistent with this idea. It is also possible that disordered binding between the regulatory mechanisms of the brain gives rise to a lack of synchronized activation of its neural networks.

=== Anesthesia ===
A deeper understanding of the mechanisms underlying consciousness on the biochemical level has practical implications which extend to the development of more effective and reliable anesthetics. This method is especially useful for the study of consciousness because of anesthetic's well-known ability to elicit unconsciousness. This often happens in a single moment, giving the impression of a collapse of conscious coherence. Stuart Hameroff is a notable anesthesiologist who promotes this method in the development of a science of consciousness.

== See also ==
- Binding problem
- Binding neuron
- Recurrent thalamo-cortical resonance
- Hard Problem of Consciousness
- Consciousness
- Attention
