= Neuronal ensemble =

Population of nervous system cells involved in a particular neural computation

A neuronal ensemble is a population of nervous system cells (or cultured neurons) involved in a particular neural computation.

== Background ==
The concept of neuronal ensemble dates back to the work of Charles Sherrington who described the functioning of the CNS as the system of reflex arcs, each composed of interconnected excitatory and inhibitory neurons. In Sherrington's scheme, α-motoneurons are the final common path of a number of neural circuits of different complexity: motoneurons integrate a large number of inputs and send their final output to muscles.

Donald Hebb theoretically developed the concept of neuronal ensemble in his famous book "The Organization of Behavior" (1949). He defined "cell assembly" as "a diffuse structure comprising cells in the cortex and diencephalon, capable of acting briefly as a closed system, delivering facilitation to other such systems". Hebb suggested that, depending on functional requirements, individual brain cells could participate in different cell assemblies and be involved in multiple computations.

In the 1980s, Apostolos Georgopoulos and his colleagues Ron Kettner, Andrew Schwartz, and Kenneth Johnson formulated a population vector hypothesis to explain how populations of motor cortex neurons encode movement direction. This hypothesis was based on the observation that individual neurons tended to discharge more for movements in particular directions, the so-called preferred directions for individual neurons. In the population vector model, individual neurons 'vote' for their preferred directions using their firing rate. The final vote is calculated by vectorial summation of individual preferred directions weighted by neuronal rates. This model proved to be successful in description of motor-cortex encoding of reach direction, and it was also capable to predict new effects. For example, Georgopoulos's population vector accurately described mental rotations made by the monkeys that were trained to translate locations of visual stimuli into spatially shifted locations of reach targets.

== Encoding ==
Neuronal ensembles encode information in a way somewhat similar to the principle of Wikipedia operation – multiple edits by many participants. Neuroscientists have discovered that individual neurons are very noisy. For example, by examining the activity of only a single neuron in the visual cortex, it is very difficult to reconstruct the visual scene that the owner of the brain is looking at. Like a single Wikipedia participant, an individual neuron does not 'know' everything and is likely to make mistakes. This problem is solved by the brain having billions of neurons. Information processing by the brain is population processing, and it is also distributed – in many cases each neuron knows a little bit about everything, and the more neurons participate in a job, the more precise the information encoding. In the distributed processing scheme, individual neurons may exhibit neuronal noise, but the population as a whole averages this noise out.

An alternative to the ensemble hypothesis is the theory that there exist highly specialized neurons that serve as the mechanism of neuronal encoding. In the visual system, such cells are often referred to as grandmother cells because they would respond in very specific circumstances—such as when a person gazes at a photo of their grandmother. Neuroscientists have indeed found that some neurons provide better information than the others, and a population of such expert neurons has an improved signal-to-noise ratio. However, the basic principle of ensemble encoding holds: large neuronal populations do better than single neurons.

The emergence of specific neural assemblies is thought to provide the functional elements of brain activity that execute the basic operations of informational processing (see Fingelkurts An.A. and Fingelkurts Al.A., 2004; 2005).

Neuronal code or the 'language' that neuronal ensembles speak is very far from being understood. Currently, there are two main theories about neuronal code. The rate encoding theory states that individual neurons encode behaviorally significant parameters by their average firing rates, and the precise time of the occurrences of neuronal spikes is not important. The temporal encoding theory, on the contrary, states that precise timing of neuronal spikes is an important encoding mechanism.

Neuronal oscillations that synchronize activity of the neurons in an ensemble appear to be an important encoding mechanism. For example, oscillations have been suggested to underlie visual feature binding (Gray, Singer and others). In addition, sleep stages and waking are associated with distinct oscillatory patterns.

Relatively simple neuronal ensembles operate in the spinal cord where they control basic automatisms such as monosynaptic tendon reflex and reciprocal innervation of muscles. (Manjarrez E et al. 2000 Modulation of synaptic transmission from segmental afferents by spontaneous activity of dorsal horn spinal neurones in the cat. J Physiol. 529 Pt 2(Pt 2):445-60. doi: 10.1111/j.1469-7793.2000.00445.x) (Manjarrez E et al. 2002 Cortical neuronal ensembles driven by dorsal horn spinal neurones with spontaneous activity in the cat. Neurosci Lett. 318(3):145-8. doi: 10.1016/s0304-3940(01)02497-1). These include both excitatory and inhibitory neurons. Central pattern generators that reside in the spinal cord are more complex ensembles for coordination of limb movements during locomotion. Neuronal ensembles of the higher brain structures is not completely understood, despite the vast literature on the neuroanatomy of these regions.

== Real-time decoding ==
After the techniques of multielectrode recordings were introduced, the task of real-time decoding of information from large neuronal ensembles became feasible. If, as Georgopoulos showed, just a few primary motor neurons could accurately predict hand motion in two planes, reconstruction of the movement of an entire limb should be possible with enough simultaneous recordings. In parallel, with the introduction of an enormous Neuroscience boost from DARPA, several lab groups used millions of dollars to make brain–machine interfaces. Of these groups, two were successful in experiments showing that animals could control external interfaces with models based on their neural activity, and that once control was shifted from the hand to the brain-model, animals could learn to control it better. These two groups are led by John Donoghue and Miguel Nicolelis, and both are involved in towards human trials with their methods.

John Donoghue formed the company Cyberkinetics to facilitate commercialization of brain-machine interfaces. They bought the Utah array from Richard A. Normann. Along with colleagues Hatsopoulos, Paninski, Fellows and Serruya, they first showed that neuronal ensembles could be used to control external interfaces by having a monkey control a cursor on a computer screen with its mind (2002).

Miguel Nicolelis worked with John Chapin, Johan Wessberg, Mark Laubach, Jose Carmena, Mikhail Lebedev and other colleagues showed that activity of large neuronal ensembles can predict arm position. This work made possible creation of brain–machine interfaces – electronic devices that read arm movement intentions and translate them into movements of artificial actuators. Carmena et al. (2003) programmed the neural coding in a brain–machine interface allowed a monkey to control reaching and grasping movements by a robotic arm, and Lebedev et al. (2005) argued that brain networks reorganize to create a new representation of the robotic appendage in addition to the representation of the animal's own limbs.

In addition to the studies by Nicolelis and Donoghue, the groups of Andrew Schwartz and Richard Andersen are developing decoding algorithms that reconstruct behavioral parameters from neuronal ensemble activity. For example, Andrew Schwartz uses population vector algorithms that he previously developed with Apostolos Georgopoulos.

Demonstrations of decoding of neuronal ensemble activity can be subdivided into two major classes: off-line decoding and on-line (real time) decoding. In the off-line decoding, investigators apply different algorithms to previously recorded data. Time considerations are usually not an issue in these studies: a sophisticated decoding algorithm can run for many hours on a computer cluster to reconstruct a 10-minute data piece. On-line algorithms decode (and, importantly, predict) behavioral parameters in real time. Moreover, the subject may receive a feedback about the results of decoding — the so-called closed-loop mode as opposed to the open-loop mode in which the subject does not receive any feedback.

As Hebb predicted, individual neurons in the population can contribute information about different parameters. For example, Miguel Nicolelis and colleagues reported that individual neurons simultaneously encoded arm position, velocity and hand gripping force when the monkeys performed reaching and grasping movements. Mikhail Lebedev, Steven Wise and their colleagues reported prefrontal cortex neurons that simultaneously encoded spatial locations that the monkeys attended to and those that they stored in short-term memory. Both attended and remembered locations could be decoded when these neurons were considered as population.

To address the question of how many neurons are needed to obtain an accurate read-out from the population activity, Mark Laubach in Nicolelis lab used neuron-dropping analysis. In this analysis, he measured neuronal read-out quality as a function of the number of neurons in the population. Read-out quality increased with the number of neurons—initially very notably, but then substantially larger neuronal quantities were needed to improve the read-out.

Luis Carrillo-Reid and colleagues has demonstrated that external activation of as few as two neurons in an ensemble could trigger resonant activation of a whole ensemble and cause the ensemble-related behavioral response in the absence of a sensory stimulus.

== See also ==
- Neural coding
- Neural decoding
