= Thalamo-cortico-thalamic circuits =

Neural pathway loops of the brain

Thalamo-cortico-thalamic circuits consist of looped neural pathways that connect the thalamus to the cerebral cortex, and connect the cerebral cortex back to the thalamus. Some researchers propose that such circuits allow the brain to obtain data on its own activity.

== See also ==
- Recurrent thalamo-cortical resonance
