= Rafael Lorente de Nó =

Spanish neuroscientist (1902–1990)

Rafael Lorente de Nó (April 8, 1902 – April 2, 1990) was a Spanish neuroscientist who advanced the scientific understanding of the nervous system with his seminal research. He was a member of the National Academy of Sciences. The National Academies Press called him "one of the premier neurophysiologists in the United States".

== Life and career ==
Lorente de Nó was born in Zaragoza, Spain. He received his medical degree from the University of Madrid in 1923. He immigrated to the United States in 1931 when he accepted a position at the Central Institute for the Deaf in St. Louis. In 1936, he joined The Rockefeller University, then known as The Rockefeller Institute for Medical Research, as an associate. He was made an associate member in 1938 and a full member in 1941. Lorente de Nó was an active member of several academic societies, among them the American Physiological Society and the American Association of Anatomists.

== Awards and distinctions ==
Lorente de Nó was elected to the National Academy of Sciences in 1950, and later also to the American Academy of Arts and Sciences. He received honorary degrees from several universities, among them Clark University, Atlanta, and his home university, Rockefeller University, but also from University of Uppsala, Sweden. His contributions to neuroscience were honored by the American Philosophical Society through the Karl Spencer Lashley Award in 1959; he was the first to receive this award. In 1986, he received the Award of Merit for his life's work.

== Notable research and discoveries ==
- Seminal research of the structure and function of the cerebral cortex, including the first description of the columnar organization of cortex. He introduced the current terminology of the subfields of the cornu Ammonis of the hippocampus (CA_{1-4}).
- Studies of the relationship between the nervous system the electrical and chemical basis of nerve functions
- Experiments that showed that nerves transmit electrical nerve impulses
- The first part of the scientific career of Rafael Lorente de Nó was focused on the histological study of the audio-vestibular nuclei and system. He was invited by Róbert Bárány to work with him at Uppsala and was the founder of clinical otorhinolaringlogy in Spain. Indeed, his first stage in the US was to work in the Central Institute for the Deaf at Washington University in St. Louis.
- Discovery of "recurrent, reciprocal connections" by Golgi's method, and proposed that excitatory loops explain certain aspects of the vestibulo-ocular reflex.
- Synthesis of tetraethylammonium (TEA) to block potassium channels.

== See also ==
- Cable theory
- Neural binding
