= Recurrent thalamo-cortical resonance =

Phenomenon of neural activity

Recurrent thalamo-cortical resonance or thalamocortical oscillation is an observed phenomenon of oscillatory neural activity between the thalamus and various cortical regions of the brain. It is proposed by Rodolfo Llinas and others as a theory for the integration of sensory information into the whole of perception in the brain. Thalamocortical oscillation is proposed to be a mechanism of synchronization between different cortical regions of the brain, a process known as temporal binding. This is possible through the existence of thalamocortical networks, groupings of thalamic and cortical cells that exhibit oscillatory properties.

Thalamocortical oscillation involves the synchronous firing of thalamic and cortical neurons at specific frequencies; in the thalamocortical system, the exact frequencies depend on current brain state and mental activity. Fast frequencies in the gamma range are associated with much of conscious thought and active cognition. The thalamus in this system acts as both the gate for sensory input to the cortex as well as the site for feedback from cortical pyramidal cells, implying a processing role in sensory perception in addition to its function in directing information flow. The state of the brain, whether it be conscious, in REM sleep, or non-rapid eye movement sleep, changes how sensory information is gated through the thalamus.

== Thalamocortical network structure ==
Thalamocortical networks consist of neurons in both the thalamus and cortex. The thalamic neurons are typically one of three types: thalamocortical, with axons extending into the cortex, reticular, and thalamic interneurons. Thalamocortical neurons (TC) vary significantly in size, which is correlated with the depth to which they project into the cortex. These cells are limited in their outputs and seem to only connect to the cortical layers and reticular thalamic neurons. Reticular neurons (RE), on the other hand, are highly interconnected and have their own intrinsic oscillatory properties. These neurons are capable of inhibiting thalamocortical activity via their direct connections to TCs. Corticothalamic neurons are the cortical neurons that TC neurons synapse on. These cells are glutaminergic excitatory cells that exhibit increasing activity as they become more depolarized. This activity is described as "bursting", firing in the gamma range at rates between 20 and 50 Hz.

== Thalamic oscillation ==
EEG signal filtered to show only gamma wave brain activity.

The thalamocortical loop starts with oscillatory thalamic cells. These cells receive both sensory input from the body as well as input from feedback pathways in the brain. In a sense, these cells serve to integrate these multiple inputs by changing their inherent oscillatory properties in response to depolarization by these many different inputs. TC neurons exhibit gamma oscillation when depolarized to greater than −45 mV, and the frequency of oscillation is related to the degree of depolarization. This oscillation is caused by the activation of leaky P/Q-type calcium channels found in the dendrites of the cells. Because of the leaky channel properties, spontaneous, inherent oscillation can also occur independent of any rhythmic input as well, though the ramifications of this capability are not entirely known and may add nothing but background noise to the thalamocortical loop.

The cortex provides feedback to the thalamus through links to dendrites of these thalamocortical cells and serves as the source of constant thalamic oscillation. Oscillatory behavior depends on the conscious/unconscious state of the brain. During active thinking, electroencephalography reveals a strong appearance of gamma range oscillation from around 20–50 Hz.

== Thalamocortical circuits ==
Thalamic cells synapse on apical dendrites of pyramidal cells in the cortex. These pyramidal cells reciprocally synapse back on thalamic neurons. Each loop is self-contained and modulated by sensory input. Inhibitory interneurons both in the cortex and the reticular nucleus of the thalamus regulate circuit activity.

=== Inputs to thalamocortical system ===
Thalamocortical circuit diagram depicting both specific/sensory and non-specific intralaminar thalamocortical systems.

The thalamus gates information into thalamocortical loops based on the source of the signal. There are two major sources for TC input: sensory perception and information about the current mental state. Cortical structures of external events or sensory data are referred to as specific inputs and enter into the ventrobasal thalamus at the "specific" thalamic nuclei. These neurons project to layer IV of the cortex. Similarly, nonspecific inputs provide context from internal state of the brain and enter into intralaminar "non-specific" nuclei in the centrolateral thalamus with axons in layers I and VI. Both types of TC neurons synapse on the pyramidal cortical cells which are thought to integrate the signals. In this way, outside sensory information is introduced into the current context of cognition.

=== Resonant columns ===
Studies involving manipulation of slices of visual cortex have shown that thalamocortical resonance from stimulated TCs induces the formation of coherent regions of similar electrical activity through vertical layers of the cortex. In essence this means that groupings of activated cortical cells form from the activation of these thalamic cells. These regions are columnar and are physically separated from adjacent resonance columns by areas of inhibited cortex between them. It is not known what the exact function of these columns is, although their formation occurs only when the cortical white matter afferents are stimulated at the gamma frequency range, implying an association with task-focused thought. The regions of inactive cortex that form between cortical columns were determined to be actively inhibited; administration of a GABA_{A} blocker stops columnar development.

=== Temporal binding ===
Thalamocortical resonance is thought to be a potential explanation for coherence of perception in the brain. Temporal coincidence could occur through this mechanism by the integration of both specific and non-specific thalamic nuclei at the pyramidal cortical cell, as they both synapse on its apical dendrites. Feedback from the cortical cell back to the thalamic nuclei then relays the integrated signal. As there are numerous thalamocortical loops throughout the cortex, this process takes place simultaneously across many different regions of the brain during conscious perception. It is this ability to support large-scale synchronized events between remote brain regions that may provide for coherent perception. Altogether, the specific, ventrobasal neurons in the thalamus serve to introduce sensory input to a self-sustained feedback loop that is sustained by the non-specific, centrolateral TCs relaying information about the current cognitive state of the brain.

== Relation to brain activity ==
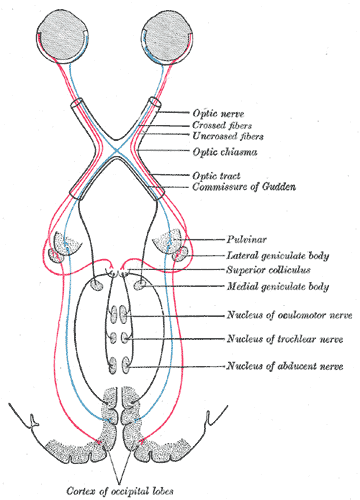
The human visual pathway. The lateral geniculate nucleus, a region of the thalamus, exhibits thalamocortical oscillation with the visual cortex.

Thalamocortical oscillation is thought to be responsible for the synchronization of neural activity between different regions of the cortex and is associated with the appearance of specific mental states depending on the frequency range of the most prominent oscillatory activity, gamma most associated with conscious, selective concentration on tasks, learning (perceptual and associative), and short-term memory. Magnetoencephalography (MEG) has been used to show that during conscious perception, gamma-band frequency electrical activity and thalamocortical resonance prominently occurs in the human brain. Absence of these gamma-band patterns correlates with nonconscious states and is characterized by the presence of lower-frequency oscillations instead.

=== Vision ===
The lateral geniculate nucleus, known as the major relay center from the sensory neurons in the eyes to the visual cortex, is found in the thalamus and has thalamocortical oscillatory properties, forming a feedback loop between the thalamus and the visual cortex. Sensory input can be seen to modulate the oscillatory patterns of thalamocortical activity while awake. In the case of vision, stimulation from light sources can be seen to cause direct changes in the amplitude of the thalamocortical oscillations as measured by EEG.

=== Sleep ===
Gamma wave thalamocortical oscillation is prominent during REM sleep, similar to the awakened, active brain. Contrary to the conscious state, however, it appears that sensory input may be blocked or gated from interfering with the intrinsic activity of the brain during REM. Measures of bulk electrical signalling in the brain by MEG show no impact of auditory stimuli on the gamma wave patterns; measurements on conscious subjects show a distinct modulation due to the auditory input. In this way, the thalamocortical system acts to gate the brain from external stimuli during REM.

Non-rapid eye movement (NREM) sleep differs from REM in that gamma activity is no longer prominent, stepping aside for lower frequency oscillations. While electrical activity at gamma frequencies can occasionally be detected in NREM, it is infrequent and comes in bursts. The exact purpose of its appearance in NREM is not understood. In NREM sleep, thalamocortical oscillatory activity is still present, but the overall frequencies range from the slow (<1 Hz), to the delta (1–4 Hz), and theta (4–7 Hz) range. Synchronized theta oscillation has additionally been observed in the hippocampus during NREM.

=== Alpha oscillations and attention ===
Gamma-range oscillations are not the only rhythms associated with conscious thought and activity. Thalamocortical alpha frequency oscillations have been noted in the human occipital-parietal cortex. This activity could be originated by the pyramidal neurons in layer IV. It has been shown that alpha rhythms seem to be related to the focus of one's attention: external focus on visual tasks diminishes alpha activity while internal focus as in heavy working memory tasks show an increase in alpha magnitudes. This is contrary to gamma wave oscillatory frequencies which emerge in selective focus tasks.

== Thalamocortical dysrhythmia ==
Thalamocortical dysrhythmia (TCD) is a proposed explanation for certain cognitive disorders. It occurs upon the disruption of normal gamma-band electrical activity between the cortex and thalamic neurons during awakened, conscious states. This disorder is associated with diseases and conditions such as neuropathic pain, tinnitus, and Parkinson's disease and is characterized by the presence of unusually low-frequency resonance in the thalamocortical system. TCD is associated with disruption of many brain functions including cognition, sensory perception, and motor control and occurs when thalamocortical neurons become inappropriately hyperpolarized, allowing T-type calcium channels to activate and the oscillatory properties of the thalamocortical neurons to change. A repeated burst of action potentials occurs at lower frequencies in the 4–10 Hz range. These bursts can be sustained by inhibition from the thalamic reticular nucleus and may cause an activation of cortical regions that are normally inhibited by gamma-band activity during resonance column formation. While the effect of the deviation from normal patterns of gamma oscillatory activity during conscious perception is not entirely settled, it is proposed that the phenomenon can be used to explain chronic pain in cases where there is no specific peripheral nerve damage.

== See also ==
- Neural oscillation
- Thalamo-cortico-thalamic circuits
- Brain
- Consciousness
- Perception
