= Subthreshold membrane potential oscillations =

Neurobiological terminology

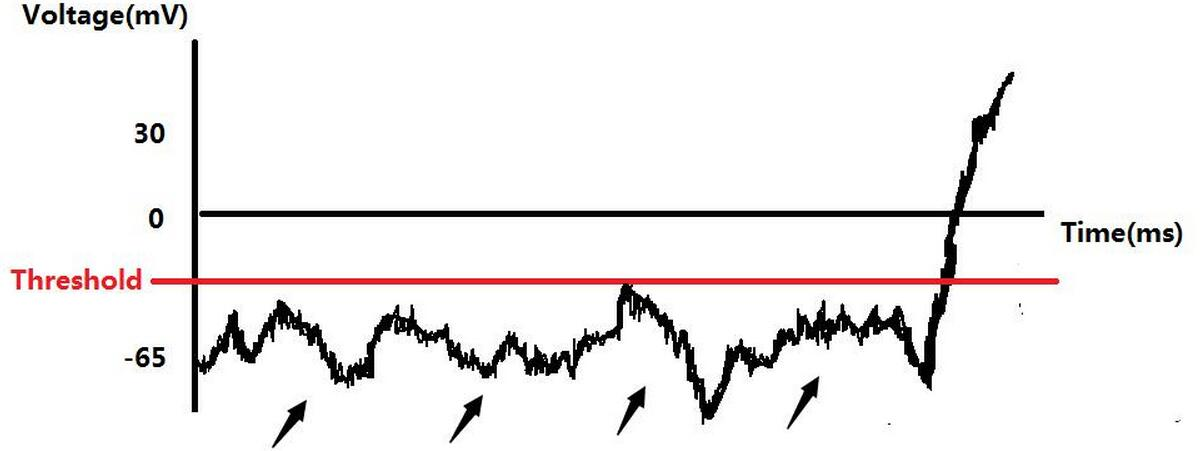
Figure 1.

Subthreshold membrane potential oscillations are membrane oscillations that do not directly trigger an action potential since they do not reach the necessary threshold for firing. However, they may facilitate sensory signal processing.

Neurons produce action potentials when their membrane potential increases past a critical threshold. In order for neurons to reach threshold for action potential to fire, enough sodium (Na+) ions must enter the cell through voltage gated sodium channels through membrane and depolarize the cell. The threshold is reached to overcome the electrochemical equilibrium within a neuron, where there is a balance between potassium ions (K+) moving down their concentration gradient (inside the cell to outside), and the electrical gradient that prevents K+ from moving down its own gradient. Once the threshold value is reached, an action potential is produced, causing a rapid increase of Na+ enters the cell with more Na+ channels along the membrane opening, resulting in a rapid depolarization of the cell. Once the cell has been depolarized, voltage-gated sodium channels close, causing potassium channels to open; K+ ions then proceed to move against their concentration gradient out of the cell.

However, if the voltage is below the threshold, the neuron does not fire, but the membrane potential still fluctuates due to postsynaptic potentials and intrinsic electrical properties of neurons. Therefore, these subthreshold membrane potential oscillations do not trigger action potentials, since the firing of an action potential is an "all-or-nothing" response, and these oscillations do not allow for the depolarization of the neuron to reach the threshold needed, which is typically around -55 mV; an "all-or-nothing" response refers to the ability of a neuron to fire an action potential only after reaching the exact threshold. For example, figure 1 depicts the localized nature and the graded potential nature of these subthreshold membrane potential oscillations, also giving a visual representation of their placement on an action potential graph, comparing subthreshold oscillations versus a fire above the threshold. In some types of neurons, the membrane potential can oscillate at specific frequencies. These oscillations can produce firing by joining with depolarizations. Although subthreshold oscillations do not directly result in neuronal firing, they may facilitate synchronous activity of neighboring neurons. It may also facilitate computation, particularly processing of sensory signals. All in all, although the subthreshold membrane potential oscillations do not produce action potentials by themselves, through summation, they are able to still impact action potential outcomes.

== Overview ==
Neurons display, beyond synaptic and action potentials, rhythmic subthreshold membrane potential oscillations (a particular type of neural oscillations). These oscillations, which resembled sinusoidal wave forms, were originally discovered in the mammalian inferior olive nucleus cells. The functional relevance of subthreshold oscillations concerns the nature of the intrinsic electrical properties of neurons; that is, the electrical responsiveness are not derived from interactions with other cells. These properties define the dynamic phenotype independently from form or connectivity. Subthreshold oscillation frequency can vary, from few Hz to over 40 Hz, and their dynamic properties have been studied in detail in relation to neuronal activity coherence and timing in CNS, in particular with respect to the 10 Hz physiological tremor that controls motor execution, Theta rhythm in the entorhinal cortex, and gamma band activity in cortical inhibitory interneurons and in thalamus neurons. They have also been described and studied in layers V of the entorhinal cortex, the inferior olive in vivo, the olfactory bulb and the dorsal cochlear nucleus. These neurons have been a major input into the cerebellum, as well, and have been found to contribute to the overall generation of movement patterns. The dynamic aspects of such oscillations have been defined using mathematical modeling.

Based on the analysis done by Bohemer et al., the hypothalamic supraoptic nucleus (SON) contains two major populations of magnocellular neurosecretory neurons which produces and secretes vasopressin and oxytocin, respectively. The study examined electrophysiological properties and ionic bases of subthreshold oscillation of the membrane potential in 104 magnocellular neurons of rats, using intracellular recording techniques. The study found that SMOP that occurred in all neurons examined were voltage-dependent; oscillation was not a result of excitatory or inhibitory activity and neither was it from an electric coupling. This suggests that the subthreshold oscillation of the membrane potential may be crucial for inter-neuronal synchronization of discharge and for the amplification of synaptic events.

Neurons of a subpopulation of supraoptic neurosecretory cells are able to generate phasic bursts of action potentials. In the neurons examined in this experiment, action potentials are succeeded by a depolarizing after-potential. Another article investigated the effect of GABAergic input, an example of an inhibitor, to the model of the fast-spiking neuron. They suggested that inhibitory input will be able to induce a stuttering episode in these cells.

GABA, an important neurotransmitter, is involved with modulating synaptic firing within the brain. It's been found that inhibitory neurons, including GABA, depolarize synchronously with excitatory neurons. However, they exhibit varying activities during different brain states. This inhibitor is critical for sustaining subthreshold membrane potential oscillations and for excitatory synaptic impulses. Maintaining the equilibrium of GABA presence in the synapse (release and reuptake of GABA) is necessary for these rhythmic subthreshold membrane potential oscillations to occur.

In addition to neurons firing action potentials, they can also perform synchronized spiking or bursts. Subthreshold membrane potential oscillations do not create an action potential; however, neurons do experience bursting when they group together and create a synchronized potential by firing all at once, which is usually the result of these subthreshold potentials.

Several studies have used various techniques to study the frequency of subthreshold oscillations at a different membrane potential. For example, a study examined the frequencies of SMPO in different anatomical positions on the dorsoventral axis of a rat medial entorhinal cortex. They used whole-cell patch recording in vivo and biophysical modeling in compartmental simulations of entorhinal stellate cells to examine the properties (SMPO), at different membrane potentials of the entorhinal cortex layer II stellate cells. This technique incorporates electrical stimulation of polar molecules in cell membrane. The study found that Dorsal cells are likely to show a positive slope of peak frequency with depolarization, whereas ventral cells tend to show a negative slope of peak frequency with depolarization. These findings illustrate that there are high frequencies of SMPO in dorsal cells and low frequencies in the ventral cells. A similar study that did whole-cell recordings of olivary neurons in vivo to investigate the relationship between subthreshold activities and spiking behavior in an intact brain illustrates that the majority of neurons displayed subthreshold oscillation activities. Which means that the inferior olive of mammals’ brain exhibits relatively stable frequencies settings of oscillations. As a result, this might be used to generate and rest temporal firing patterns in an electrically coupled ensemble.

== Sensory Circuits ==
Subthreshold membrane potential oscillations play an important role in the development of the sensory systems, including, but not being limited to the visual system and the olfactory system.

In the visual system, through the help of electroencephalogram or EEG readings, the subthreshold membrane potential oscillations help equip the cortex for not only processing visual stimulation, but also neuronal plasticity. These oscillations are present even before birth and also before a newborn opens its eyes, as they are forms of maturation and preparation of the human sensory cortex, which is a part of the cerebral cortex that is responsible for processing and encoding sensory information. This subthreshold activity is responsible for shaping circuits for maturation and are especially distinct in the retina, in the form of retinal waves.

In the olfactory system, responsible for sense of smell, according to the study, subthreshold membrane potential oscillations present in mitral cells, which are neurons in the olfactory system, are said to influence the timing of the spikes of action potentials, which in turn allows for the synchronization of multiple mitral cells. The study also mentions how this oscillatory activity is thought to also impact excitatory postsynaptic potentials in the way that they act as refinement tools to this post neural activity.

== See also ==
- Neural oscillation
