= Phase synchronization =

Phase synchronization is the process by which two or more cyclic signals tend to oscillate with a repeating sequence of relative phase angles.

Phase synchronisation is usually applied to two waveforms of the same frequency with identical phase angles with each cycle. However it can be applied if there is an integer relationship of frequency, such that the cyclic signals share a repeating sequence of phase angles over consecutive cycles. These integer relationships are called Arnold tongues which follow from bifurcation of the circle map.

One example of phase synchronization of multiple oscillators can be seen in the behavior of Southeast Asian fireflies. At dusk, the flies begin to flash periodically with random phases and a gaussian distribution of native frequencies. As night falls, the flies, sensitive to one another's behavior, begin to synchronize their flashing. After some time all the fireflies within a given tree (or even larger area) will begin to flash simultaneously in a burst.

Thinking of the fireflies as biological oscillators, we can define the phase to be 0° during the flash and +-180° exactly halfway until the next flash. Thus, when they begin to flash in unison, they synchronize in phase.

Phase synchronization patterns (n:m synchronization) have been also observed in the interaction of physiological and organ systems, for example in maternal-fetal cardiac phase-synchronization, brain blood flow velocity vs. peripheral blood pressure in stroke, cortico-muscular and cardio-respiratory coupling with the degree of synchronization changing across physiological states (sleep/wake, sleep stages) and age groups.

One way to keep a local oscillator "phase synchronized" with a remote transmitter uses a phase-locked loop.

== See also ==
- Algebraic connectivity
- Coherence (physics)
- Kuramoto model
- Synchronization (alternating current)
