= Dyssomnia =

Family of sleep disorders involving sleep difficulty and fatigue

- Specialty: Psychiatry, psychology, sleep medicine

Dyssomnias are a broad classification of sleeping disorders involving difficulty getting to sleep, remaining asleep, or of excessive sleepiness.

Dyssomnias are primary disorders of initiating or maintaining sleep or of excessive sleepiness and are characterized by a disturbance in the amount, quality, or timing of sleep.

Patients may complain of difficulty getting to sleep or staying asleep, intermittent wakefulness during the night, early morning awakening, or combinations of any of these. Transient episodes are usually of little significance. Stress, caffeine, physical discomfort, daytime napping, and early bedtimes are common factors.

== Types ==
There are over 31 recognized kinds of dyssomnias. The major three groups, along with the group types, include:

- Intrinsic sleep disorders
  - Idiopathic hypersomnia
  - Narcolepsy
  - Periodic limb movement disorder
  - Restless legs syndrome
  - Obstructive sleep apnea
  - Central sleep apnea
  - Sleep state misperception
  - Psychophysiologic insomnia
  - Recurrent hypersomnia
  - Post-traumatic hypersomnia
  - Central alveolar hypoventilation syndrome
- Extrinsic sleep disorders
  - Alcohol-dependent sleep disorder
  - Food allergy insomnia
  - Inadequate sleep routine
- Circadian rhythm sleep disorders, both intrinsic and extrinsic
  - Advanced sleep phase disorder
  - Delayed sleep phase disorder
  - Irregular sleep–wake rhythm disorder
  - Non-24-hour sleep-wake disorder
  - Jetlag
  - Shift work sleep disorder

== Treatments ==
Managing dyssomnias involves various strategies to regulate sleep patterns.

Sleep hygiene focuses on eliminating behaviors that disrupt sleep, particularly for shift workers.

Melatonin, a natural sleep-inducing hormone, can help adjust circadian rhythms in cases like jet lag and shift work.

Light therapy (2500–10,000 lux for 30–120 minutes daily) aids circadian realignment—morning exposure promotes wakefulness, while evening exposure delays sleep onset.

Zeitgebers (“time givers”) such as morning light, meal times, and social interactions help reset internal clocks. Phase shifting gradually adjusts sleep schedules in 15–60 minute increments to align with new time zones or routines. Environmental modifications allow adaptation to non-traditional light-dark cycles, benefiting shift workers.

Lastly, sleep logs track sleep-wake patterns, assisting in diagnosis and treatment while offering insight into individual sleep behaviors. These interventions can effectively regulate circadian rhythms and improve sleep quality.

- Sleeping medication
- Cognitive behaviour therapy

== See also ==
- Parasomnia
- Somnolence
