= Shift work sleep disorder =

- Other names: Shift work disorder; SWD
- Specialty: Neurology, psychology

Shift work sleep disorder (SWSD) is a circadian rhythm sleep disorder characterized by insomnia, excessive sleepiness, or both affecting people whose work hours overlap with the typical sleep period. Insomnia can be the difficulty to fall asleep or waking up before the individual has slept enough. About 20% of the working population participates in shift work. SWSD commonly goes undiagnosed, and it is estimated that 10–40% of shift workers have SWSD. The excessive sleepiness appears when the individual has to be productive, awake and alert. Both symptoms are predominant in SWSD. There are numerous shift work schedules, and they may be permanent, intermittent, or rotating; consequently, the manifestations of SWSD are quite variable. Most people with different schedules than the ordinary one (from 8 AM to 6 PM) might have these symptoms but the difference is that SWSD is continual, long-term, and starts to interfere with the individual's life.

== Health effects ==
There have been many studies suggesting health risks associated with shift work. Many studies have associated sleep disorders with decreased bone mineral density (BMD) and risk for fracture. Researchers have found that those who work long-term in night positions, like nurses, are at a great risk for wrist and hip fractures (RR=1.37). Low fertility and issues during pregnancy are increased in shift workers. Obesity, diabetes, insulin resistance, elevated body fat levels and dyslipidemias were shown to be much higher in those who work night shift. SWSD can increase the risk of mental disorders. Specifically, depression, anxiety, and alcohol use disorder is increased in shift workers. Because the circadian system regulates the rate of chemical substances in the body, when it is impaired, several consequences are possible. Acute sleep loss has been shown to increase the levels of t-tau in blood plasma, which may explain the neurocognitive effects of sleep loss.

=== Sleep quality ===
Sleep loss and decreased quality of sleep is another effect of shift work. To promote a healthy lifestyle, the American Academy of Sleep Medicine recommended that an adult have 7 or more hours of sleep per day. Sleep deprivation and sleep disorders are factors that contribute significantly to these errors. In the same article, the authors affirm that there is a high prevalence of sleepiness and symptoms of sleep disorders related to the circadian system in medical center nurses. In a study done with around 1100 nurses, almost half of them (49%) reported sleeping less than 7 hours per day, a significant increase compared to national figures, in which 28% of people claimed to sleep less than 7 hours per night. Having a lack of sleep can impact cognitive performance. For example, it might become difficult to stay focused and concentrate, and reaction times might also be slowed down. SWSD might interfere with making decisions quickly, driving, or flying safely. Sleep loss seen in shift workers greatly impairs cognitive performance; being awake for 24 hours straight results in a cognitive performance that is equal to a blood-alcohol of 0.10, which is over the legal limit in most states. All of these factors can affect work efficiency and cause accidents. Michael Lee et al. demonstrated that those working night shifts had a significantly higher risk of hazardous driving events when compared to those on a typical day shift schedule. Accidents in the workplace have been found to be 60% higher in shift workers. They can affect the individual's social life and cause a lack of well-being and happiness. Poor sleep quality has also been associated with decreased quality of life, based on a SF-36 assessment.

=== Sleep and alertness ===
Although SWD affects many shift workers, its manifestation is still unclear within the general shift-working population. A field study investigating the nature of SWD in an experimental (with SWD) and control (non-SWD) group of Finnish shift workers revealed decreased total sleep time (TST) and increased sleep deficit before morning shifts. Furthermore, the SWD group also exhibited decreased objective sleep efficiency, decrease in sleep compensation over the free days, increased sleep latency, and finally poorer sleep quality was recorded in the SWD group compared to the non-SWD group. Moreover, shift workers with SWD scored significantly higher on the Karolinska Sleepiness Scale (KSS) when assessed at the beginning and the end of morning shifts and at the end of night shifts, while having more attentional lapses at the beginning of night shifts.

Many studies have shown evidence of how partial and total sleep deprivation affects work productivity, absenteeism, fatal workplace accidents, and more. In a study by Akkerstedt et al., those who had a hard time sleeping in the past two weeks were at a greater risk for having a fatal workplace accident (RR=1.89, 95% CI 1.22–2.94). Other sleep disorders, like OSA which are risk factors for SWSD, have also been associated with low productivity, absenteeism, and accidents. At a cognitive level, sleep deprivation has been shown to cause decreased attentiveness, increased micro-sleeps, delayed psychomotor response, performance deterioration, neglect of activities, decline in working memory, and more.

=== Immune functioning ===
Partial and total sleep deprivation has been linked to an increase of pro-inflammatory markers, such as IL-6, and a decrease in anti-inflammatory markers, such as IL-10, that plays a role in tumor suppression. Chronic shift work has been associated with decreased immune function in nurses. In a study by Naigi, et al., over the course of a shift, nurses exhibited decreasing levels of Natural Killer cells, an innate immune response that plays a role in infectious disease and tumor suppression. Other researchers have found that less sleep at night increased the risk of developing the common cold. A supporting study by Moher et al. showed that shift workers were more likely to develop infectious diseases after exposure compared to daytime workers. A poorly functioning immune system may leave workers vulnerable for developing occupational illnesses. Sleep loss is also associated with an increase in TNF, a marker of systemic immune functioning.

=== Cardiovascular disease ===
Decreased sleep quality and duration have also been associated with other chronic illnesses, such as cardiovascular disease. Many studies have shown that prolonged sleeplessness and sleep disorders, such as OSA, increases systemic levels of CRP, a marker of cardiovascular disease. Many studies have shown that lack of sleep causes blood pressure to increase from the prolonged stimulation of the nervous system. The increase of inflammatory markers, like IL-6, up-regulate the production of CRP.

==== In firefighters ====
SWSD can affect many occupations, but firefighters and emergency medical technicians are at a greater risk because of their extended (24hr) shift and frequent sleep interruptions due to emergencies. Many firefighters have sleep disorders as a result of their extended shift and frequently disrupted sleep. In a study on firefighters by Barger, et al., over a third of study participants screened positive for a sleep disorder, but most had not received a previous medical diagnosis for any sleep disorders. Those with sleep disorders were also at a higher risk for being in a motor vehicle crash (OR=2.0 95% CI 1.29–3.12, p=0.0021), near crash (OR=2.49 95% CI 2.13–2.91, p < 0.0001), and nodding off while driving (OR=2.41 95% CI 2.06–2.82, p < 0.0001).

== Symptoms ==
- Excessive sleepiness
- Difficulty sleeping
- Difficulty concentrating
- Headaches
- Lack of energy

== Cause and prevalence ==
Insomnia and wake-time sleepiness are related to misalignment between the timing of a non-standard wake–sleep schedule and the endogenous circadian propensity for sleep and wake. In addition to circadian misalignment, attempted sleep at unusual times can be interrupted by noise, social obligations, and other factors. There is an inevitable degree of sleep deprivation associated with sudden transitions in sleep schedule.

The prevalence of SWSD is unclear because it is not often formally diagnosed and its definitions vary in scientific literature. However, SWSD is estimated to affect 2–10% of general population and about 27% of night and rotating workers. The use of the third edition of the International Classification of Sleep Disorders (ICSD-3) criteria has decreased the prevalence estimates of SWSD compared to the old ICSD-2 criteria after 2014.

There are various risk factors, including age. Although SWSD can appear at any age, the highest prevalence is in the 50 years old and above age bracket and even more so in cases of irregular schedules. Gender is also a factor. It may be that female night workers sleep less than their male counterparts. A possible explanation is the social obligations that can increase their vulnerability to SWSD. Female night workers also seem to be more sleepy at work.

Some people are more affected by shift work and sleeplessness than others, and some will be impaired on some tasks while others will always perform well on the same tasks. Some people have a morning preference but others not. Genetic predisposition is an important predictor of which people are vulnerable to SWSD.

== Medical field ==
=== Cognitive impact ===
Shift work sleep disorder affects many individuals, especially those within the medical field. Research done by The Journal Of Sleep Research examine the difference in cognitive function using sleep-deprived and well-rested nurses using autobiographical memory skills. The participants underwent the autobiographical memory test, as well as anxiety and depression inventories. The researchers found that a sleep-deprived group of individuals scored significantly higher in the depression score and remembered more negative than positive memories. The sleep-deprived group also scored significantly lower than the well-rested group in autobiographical memory and specific memories. This study is similar to the one done by the National Center for Biotechnology Information, which found that their hypothesis of sleep deprivation and the cognitive impact it has on nurses was strongly supported in 69% of shift workers. The impairment in cognitive performance, such as general intellect, reaction time, and memory, was statistically significant among the staff nurses due to poor sleep quality and decreased alertness while awake.

=== Patient care ===
Shift work sleep disorder affects patient care within all aspects of the medical field. Research published in European Review for Medical and Pharmacological Sciences analyzed the correlation between the clinical risk management and the occurrence of medication errors and the effects of the shift work on inpatient nurses. The researchers reviewed 19 out of 217 research articles and focused on the impact of workload, shifts and sleep deprivation on the probability of making medication errors. They found that the main reason behind medication errors are stress, fatigue, increased workload, night shifts, nurse staffing ratio and workflow interruptions.

== Mechanism ==
Brain arousal is stimulated by the circadian system during the day and sleep is usually stimulated at night. The rhythms are maintained in the suprachiasmatic nucleus (SCN), located in the anterior hypothalamus in the brain, and synchronized with the day/night cycle. Gene-transcription feedback loops in individual SCN cells form the molecular basis of biological timekeeping. Circadian phase shifts are dependent on the schedule of light exposure, the intensity, and previous exposure to light. Variations in exposure can advance or delay these rhythms. For example, the rhythms can be delayed due to light exposure at night.

Photoreceptors located in the retina of the eye send information about environmental light through the retinohypothalamic tract to the SCN. The SCN regulates the pineal gland, which secretes the hormone melatonin. Typically, the secretion of melatonin begins two hours before bedtime and ends two hours prior to waking up. A decline in neuronal firing in the SCN is caused by the binding of melatonin to the MT1 and MT2 melatonin receptors. It is believed that the reduction in firing in the SCN stimulates sleep. While day-active individuals produce melatonin at night, night shift workers' production of melatonin is suppressed at night due to light exposure.

=== Circadian misalignment ===
Circadian misalignment plays a major role in shift work sleep disorder. Circadian misalignment occurs when there is no complete adaptation to a night shift schedule. The hormones cortisol and melatonin are an important part of the circadian rhythm. In circadian misalignment, cortisol and melatonin lack entrainment to a night oriented schedule and stay on a daytime schedule. Melatonin continues to peak at night during a shift workers awake time and decreases during a shift workers sleep time. Cortisol levels are lower during a shift workers awake time and remain higher during shift workers sleep time.

== Diagnosis ==
The primary symptoms of shift work sleep disorder are insomnia and excessive sleepiness associated with working (and sleeping) at non-standard times. Shift work sleep disorder is also associated with falling asleep at work. Total daily sleep time is usually shortened and sleep quality is less in those who work night shifts compared to those who work day shifts. Sleepiness is manifested as a desire to nap, unintended dozing, impaired mental acuity, irritability, reduced performance, and accident proneness. Shift work is often combined with extended hours of duty, so fatigue can be a compounding factor. The symptoms coincide with the duration of shift work and usually remit with the adoption of a conventional sleep-wake schedule. The boundary between a "normal response" to the rigors of shift work and a diagnosable disorder is not sharp.

There are criteria of SWSD in the International Classification of Diseases (ICD-10), in the Diagnostic and Statistical Manual of Mental Disorders (DSM-5), and in the International Classification of Sleep Disorders (ICSD) – Second and Third Editions. The diagnosis requires the following assumptions :

- There is an insomnia or/and an excessive sleepiness with a reduction of total sleep time, all combined with an overlap of work period occurring during the habitual sleep time.
- The presence of these symptoms has lasted for at least 3 months and are associated with the shift work schedules.
- Sleep log and/or actigraphy monitoring (with sleep diaries) demonstrate for more than 14 days (work and free days included) circadian and sleep-time misalignment.
- Sleep disturbance is associated with impairment of social, occupational, and/or other waking functioning.
- These symptoms are not better explained by another sleep disorder, medical or neurologic disorder, mental disorder, medication use, poor sleep hygiene, or substance use disorder.

=== Assessments ===
There are different tools to assess shift work disorder. Patients can keep a diary. Some questionnaires could be useful as the Morningness-Eveningness Questionnaire. Actigraphy and a polysomnography sleep study could indicate some interesting patterns. Further studies are needed to see if some phase markers as the body temperature rhythm or the melatonin rhythm are efficient to assess shift work disorder. Decreased sleep quality may be assessed using the Pittsburg Sleep Quality Index (PQSI).

== Treatment ==
=== Prescribed sleep/wake scheduling ===
Experts agree that there is no such thing as an "ideal" night work schedule, but some schedules may be better than others. For example, rotating shifts every two weeks in a forward (delaying) direction was found to be easier than rotation in a backward (advancing) direction. Gradual delays ("nudging" the circadian system about an hour per day) has been shown in a laboratory setting to maintain synchrony between sleep and the endogenous circadian rhythms, but this schedule is impractical for most real world settings. Some experts have advocated short runs (1 to 2 days) of night work with time for recovery; however, in the traditional heavy industries, longer (5 to 7 day) runs remain the rule. In the end, scheduling decisions usually involve maximizing leisure time, fairness in labor relations, etc. rather than chronobiological considerations. Shift workers can benefit from adhering to sleep hygiene practices related to sleep/wake scheduling. Symptoms typically only fully resolve once a normal sleep schedule is resumed. However, circadian science-based behavioral strategies—including timed light exposure, controlled sleep-wake scheduling, and strategic caffeine use—can support adaptation and reduce symptom severity in shift workers.

Many night workers take naps during their breaks, and in some industries, planned napping at work (with facilities provided) is beginning to be accepted. A nap before starting a night shift is a logical prophylactic measure. However, naps that are too long (over 30 minutes) may generate sleep inertia, a groggy feeling after awakening that can impair performance. Therefore, brief naps (10 to 30 minutes) are preferred to longer naps (over 30 minutes). Also, long naps may interfere with the main sleep period.

In the transportation industry, safety is a major concern, and mandated hours of service rules attempt to enforce rest times.

=== Bright light treatment ===
The light-dark cycle is the most important environmental time cue for entraining circadian rhythms of most species, including humans. Circadian science has shown that strategic exposure to bright artificial light can support adaptation to night work and reduce circadian misalignment. The timing of bright light exposure is critical for its phase shifting effects. To maximize a delay of the body clock, bright light exposure should occur in the evening or first part of the night, and bright light should be avoided in the morning. Wearing dark goggles (avoiding bright light) or blue-blocking goggles during the morning commute home from work can improve circadian adaptation. For workers who want to use bright light therapy, appropriate fixtures of the type used to treat winter depression are readily available but patients need to be educated regarding their appropriate use, especially the issue of timing. Bright light treatment is not recommended for patients with light sensitivity or ocular disease. Recent approaches based on the latest circadian science, incorporate personalized light exposure and light avoidance timing within apps to help individuals adhere to optimal schedules.

=== Medication therapy ===
==== Melatonin ====
Melatonin is a hormone secreted by the pineal gland in darkness, normally at night. Its production is suppressed by light exposure, principally blue light around 460 to 480 nm. Light restriction, or dark therapy, in the hours before bedtime allows its production. Dark therapy does not require total darkness. Amber or orange colored goggles eliminate blue light to the eyes while allowing vision.

Melatonin is also available as an oral supplement. For example, in the US and Canada, the hormone melatonin is not classified as a drug; it is sold as a dietary supplement. In some other countries, it requires a prescription or is unavailable. Although it is not licensed by the FDA as a treatment for any disorder, there have been no serious side effects or complications reported to date.

Melatonin has been shown to accelerate the adaptation of the circadian system to a nighttime work schedule. Melatonin may benefit daytime sleep in night workers by an additional direct sleep promoting mechanism. Melatonin treatment may increase sleep length during both daytime and nighttime sleep in night shift workers.

==== Medications that promote alertness ====
Caffeine is the most widely used alerting drug in the world and has been shown to improve alertness in simulated night work. Caffeine and naps before a night shift reduces sleepiness during the shift. Night shift medical field workers report the highest activity, along with the least amount of sleep. These individuals require medication/power naps to function at their best. Modafinil and armodafinil are non-amphetamine alerting drugs originally developed for the treatment of narcolepsy that have been approved by the FDA (the US Food and Drug Administration) for excessive sleepiness associated with SWSD.

==== Medications that promote daytime sleep ====
Obtaining enough sleep during the day is a major problem for many night workers. Hypnotics given in the morning can lengthen daytime sleep; however, some studies have shown that nighttime sleepiness may be unaffected. Zopiclone has been shown to be ineffective in increasing sleep in shift workers.

== See also ==
- Shift work
- Jet lag
- Human factors
- Human reliability
- Polyphasic sleep
