= Circadian Sleep Disorders Network =

Circadian Sleep Disorders Network (CSD-N) is a sleep medicine organization that seeks to connect people with circadian rhythm sleep disorders (CRSDs) to spread awareness, improve treatment options, and advocate for accommodations for individuals presenting conditions impacting their sleep rhythms. In particular, they discuss delayed sleep phase disorder (DSPS), advanced sleep phase disorder (ASPS), and non-24-hour sleep–wake disorder (non-24).

== Background and history ==
Circadian Sleep Disorders Network, Inc. was founded on August 18, 2011, by Peter Mansbach, James Fadden, and Beth Macdonald in Bethesda, Maryland. The founders met one another through an email list of people with circadian rhythm sleep disorders, and decided to form a formal organization focused on CRSDs. CSD-N was founded to inform and spread awareness of circadian sleep disorders among doctors and patients. CSD-N is a non-profit governed by a Board of Directors elected by the membership for 2-year staggered terms. CSD-N also has a medical advisory board composed of many chronobiologists, including Charles Czeisler, the Director of Sleep Medicine at Harvard Medical School. The organization also includes members who sign up.

== Personnel ==
The current President is Peter Mansbach, with Alexandra Wharton serving as the Executive Vice President and James Fadden in the position of Vice President for Scientific Affairs. They also currently have seven other board members.

== Publications ==
In 2023, CSD-N published the article, "Registry and Survey of Circadian Rhythm Sleep-Wake Disorder Patients.". The article describes an analysis of a 122-question survey of the Circadian Sleep Disorder Network's registry of 479 people with clinically diagnosed circadian rhythm sleep disorder (CRSD). The survey found results that diverged from existing literature regarding CRSD, namely that CRSD patients are often tired even when sleeping on their preferred sleep schedule, and that circadian/sleep problems often precede depression. The paper also describes the inefficacy of phase-delay chronotherapy and light therapy for CRSD patients, emphasizing the importance of creating novel, effective treatments for the disorder.

== Events ==
CSD-N has also sent members to events such as SLEEP 2024, a meeting planned by the American Academy of Sleep Medicine (AASM) and the Sleep Research Society (SRS), and the Sleep Advocacy Forum and Hill Day, an advocacy event held by Project Sleep in Washington, D.C.
