= Delayed sleep phase disorder =

Chronic sleep disorder

- Other names: Delayed sleep–wake phase disorder, delayed sleep phase syndrome, delayed sleep phase type, social jet lag
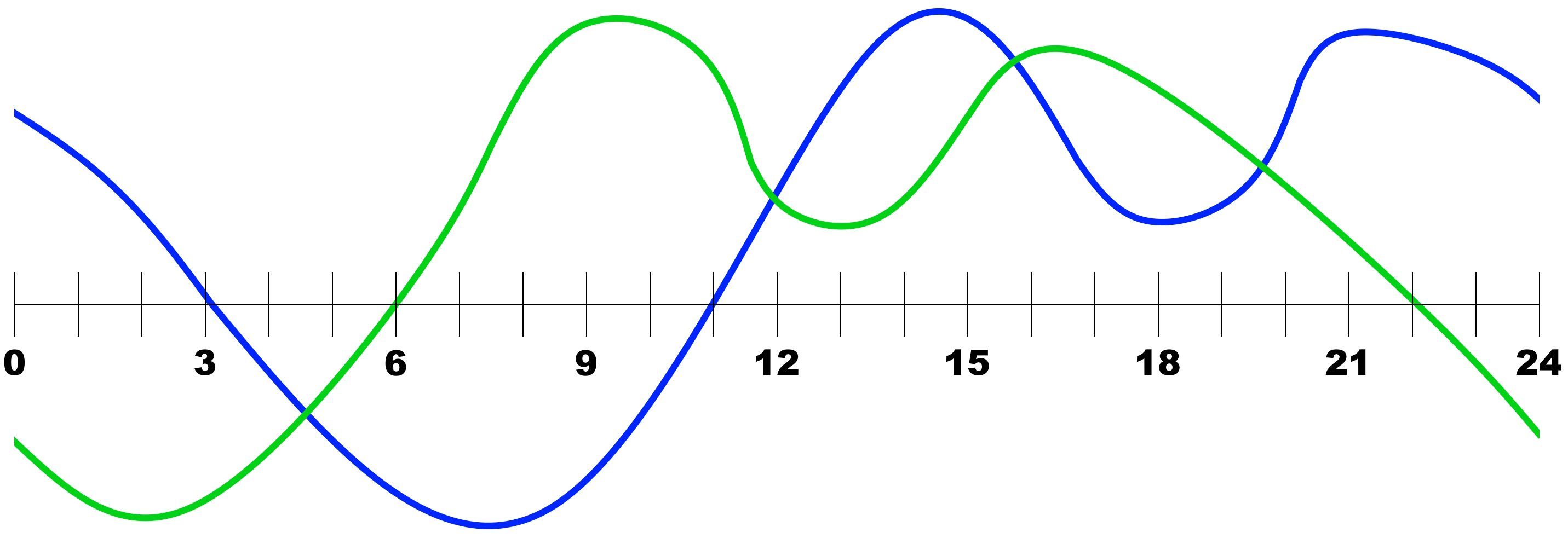
- Comparison of standard (green) and DSPD (blue) circadian rhythms
- Specialty: Sleep medicine, neurology, psychiatry
- Symptoms: Delayed sleeping times (usually after midnight), resistant to conscious attempts to change, potential occasional bouts of insomnia, extreme jet lag-like effects
- Complications: Severe cases can be disabling from a social and occupational perspective. DSPD can aggravate other medical issues that often worsen from sleep issues or stress, such as psychiatric disorders
- Duration: Usually chronic if symptoms occur/persist past adolescence
- Causes: Genetics, traumatic brain injury (secondary)
- Risk factors: Attention deficit hyperactivity disorder, traumatic brain injury (secondary)
- Diagnostic method: Debated, a consistent inability to change the late sleep cycle for a certain period of time needs to be demonstrated during a clinical interview and or a sleep diary, polysomnography, and actigraphy can also be used. The ICSD criteria are often used.
- Differential diagnosis: Other parasomnias, symptoms that are part of much greater psychiatric/neurological issues
- Prevention: Secondary causes from brain injuries can be mitigated by PPE
- Treatment: Light therapy, darkness therapy, moving important tasks to earlier times, gradually shifting to earlier bedtime and waking times, medication for augmentation or monotherapy
- Medication: Melatonin, ramelteon, aripiprazole (in low doses), agomelatine, modafinil (for eugeroic effects)
- Prognosis: Milder cases (those with earlier sleeping times) have a higher rate of remission and a longer time until relapses start after treatment is discontinued. Prognosis is generally poorer in severe cases and those who do not or cannot seek treatment.
- Frequency: Exact estimates are unreliable due to varying definitions of DSPD, though it is generally accepted that it is more common in adolescents.

Delayed sleep phase disorder (DSPD), also called delayed sleep phase syndrome and delayed sleep–wake phase disorder, is the delaying of a person's circadian rhythm (biological clock) compared to those of social norms. The disorder affects the timing of biological rhythms, including sleep, peak period of alertness, core body temperature, and hormonal cycles. People with this disorder are often called "night owls". It is considered a kind of circadian rhythm sleep disorder.

Multiple studies have found evidence for the plasticity of human circadian rhythm cycles. In one example, 15 volunteers spent 40 days and nights underground in a cave while researchers monitored their periods of waking and sleeping. Their results found significant divergence between individuals, with most participants settling upon a rhythm of 30 ± 4 hours. Researchers have speculated that the lack of exposure to natural sunrise/sunset cycles relates many of these circadian disorders' symptoms to modern habits of humans spending extended periods indoors, without sunlight exposure and with artificial light.

Symptom management may be possible with therapeutic drugs such as orexin antagonists or melatonin receptor agonists, as well as regular outdoor exercise. The syndrome may have a genetic component.

== Signs and symptoms ==
DSPD is responsible for 7% to 13% of patient complaints of chronic insomnia. But since many doctors are unfamiliar with the condition, it often goes untreated or is treated inappropriately; DSPD is often misdiagnosed as primary insomnia or as a psychiatric condition.

People with DSPD generally fall asleep some hours after midnight and have difficulty waking in the morning.

Affected people often report that while they do not get to sleep until the early morning, they do fall asleep around the same time every day. Unless they have another sleep disorder such as sleep apnea in addition to DSPD, patients can sleep well and have a normal need for sleep, but find it very difficult to get up in time for a typical school or work day. If allowed to follow their own schedules, e.g. sleeping from 4 a.m. to 1 p.m., their sleep improves and they may not experience excessive daytime sleepiness. Attempting to live on daytime society's schedule with DSPD has been compared to constantly living with jet lag; DSPD has been called "social jet lag". Social jet lag refers to a difference between a person's sleep schedule on a specific day, while DSPD is a clinical condition.

=== Comorbidity ===
==== Depression ====
In the DSPD cases reported in the literature, about half the patients had clinical depression or other psychological problems, about the same proportion as among patients with chronic insomnia. According to the International Classification of Sleep Disorders (ICSD):

Although some degree of psychopathology is present in about half of adult patients with DSPD, there appears to be no particular psychiatric diagnostic category into which these patients fall. Psychopathology is not particularly more common in DSPD patients compared to patients with other forms of "insomnia". ... Whether DSPD results directly in clinical depression, or vice versa, is unknown, but many patients express considerable despair and hopelessness over sleeping normally again.

A direct neurochemical relationship between sleep mechanisms and depression is another possibility.

DSPD may have a role in causing depression because it can be so stressful and misunderstood. A 2008 study from the University of California, San Diego found no association of bipolar disorder (history of mania) with DSPD and states:

there may be behaviorally-mediated mechanisms for comorbidity between DSPD and depression. For example, the lateness of DSPD cases and their unusual hours may lead to social opprobrium and rejection, which might be depressing.

That half of DSPD patients are not depressed indicates that DSPD is not merely a symptom of depression. Sleep researcher Michael Terman has suggested that those who follow their internal circadian clocks may be less likely to have depression than those trying to live by a different schedule.

DSPD patients with depression may be best served by seeking treatment for both problems. There is some evidence that effectively treating DSPD can improve the patient's mood and make antidepressants more effective.

Vitamin D deficiency has been linked to depression. People who do not get enough sunlight exposure (about 20 to 30 minutes three times a week, depending on skin tone, latitude, and the time of year) could be at risk, without adequate dietary sources or supplements.

==== Attention deficit hyperactivity disorder ====
DSPD is genetically linked to attention deficit hyperactivity disorder (ADHD), according to genetic polymorphism studies that have linked genes involved in ADHD to genes involved in circadian rhythm. A high proportion of people with ADHD have DSPD.

==== Overweight ====
A 2019 study from Boston showed a relationship of evening chronotypes and greater social jet lag with greater body weight / adiposity in adolescent girls, but not boys, independent of sleep duration.

==== Obsessive–compulsive disorder ====
People with obsessive–compulsive disorder are diagnosed with DSPD at a much higher rate than others.

==== Head injury ====
Several documented cases of DSPD and non-24-hour sleep–wake disorder developed after a traumatic head injury. Some DSPD cases develop into non-24-hour sleep–wake disorder, a severe and debilitating disorder in which a person sleeps later each day.

== Mechanism ==
DSPD is a disorder of the body's timing system—the circadian clock. People with DSPD may have an unusually long circadian cycle and reduced response to the resetting effect of daylight on the body clock and may respond strongly to the delaying effects of evening light and weakly to the advancing effect of light earlier in the day. In support of the increased sensitivity to evening light hypothesis, "the percentage of melatonin suppression by a bright light stimulus of 1,000 lux administered 2 hours prior to the melatonin peak has been reported to be greater in 15 DSPD patients than in 15 controls".

The altered phase relationship between the timing of sleep and the circadian rhythm of body core temperature has been reported in DSPD patients studied in entrained conditions. That such an alteration has also been observed in temporal isolation (i.e., in the absence of external time cues) is evidence that DSPD's etiology goes beyond simply a reduced capacity to achieve and maintain the appropriate phase relationship between sleep timing and the 24-hour day. Rather, the disorder may also reflect a fundamental inability of the endogenous circadian timing system to maintain normal internal phase relationships among physiological systems and to properly adjust those relationships in the confines of a 24-hour day. In normal subjects, the phase relationship between sleep and temperature changes in temporal isolation relative to that observed under entrained conditions: in isolation, temperature minimum tends to occur toward the beginning of sleep, whereas under entrained conditions, temperature minimum occurs toward the end of the sleep period—a change in phase angle of several hours; DSPD patients may have a reduced capacity to achieve such a change in phase angle in response to entrainment.

Possibly as a consequence of these altered internal phase relationships, the quality of sleep in DSPD may be substantially poorer than that of normal subjects, even when bedtimes and wake times are self-selected. One DSPD subject exhibited an average sleep onset latency twice that of the three control subjects and almost twice the amount of wakefulness after sleep onset (WASO) as control subjects, resulting in significantly poorer sleep efficiency. The DSPD subject's temporal distribution of slow wave sleep was also significantly altered. This finding may suggest that, in addition to abnormal circadian clock function, DSPD may be characterized by alteration(s) in the homeostatic regulation of sleep. Specifically, the rate at which Process S is depleted during sleep may be slowed. This could conceivably contribute to the excessive sleep inertia upon awakening those with DSPD often report. It has also been hypothesized that, due to the altered phase angle between sleep and temperature observed in DSPD, and the tendency for longer sleep periods, people may simply sleep through the phase-advance portion of the light PRC. Though quite limited in terms of the total number of DSPD patients studied, such data seem to contradict the notion that DSPD is merely a disorder of sleep timing, rather than a disorder of the sleep system itself.

People with normal circadian systems can generally fall asleep quickly at night if they slept too little the night before. Falling asleep earlier will in turn automatically help to advance their circadian clocks due to decreased light exposure in the evening. In contrast, people with DSPD have difficulty falling asleep before their usual sleep time even if they are sleep-deprived. Sleep deprivation does not reset the circadian clock of DSPD patients, as it does with normal people.

=== Genetic factors ===
In 2017, researchers linked DSPD to at least one genetic mutation. The syndrome usually develops in early childhood or adolescence. An adolescent version may disappear in late adolescence or early adulthood; otherwise, DSPD is a lifelong condition. The best estimate of prevalence among adults is 0.13–0.17% (1 in 600). Prevalence among adolescents is as high as 16%.

In most cases, it is not known what causes the abnormality in the biological clocks of DSPD patients. DSPD tends to run in families, and a growing body of evidence suggests that the problem is associated with the hPer3 (human period 3) gene and the CRY1 gene.

For people with a circadian period significantly longer than 24 hours, a differential diagnosis may be warranted.

== Diagnosis ==
A sleep diary with nighttime at the top and the weekend in the middle, to better notice trends

DSPD is diagnosed clinically from a longstanding history of difficulty both falling asleep and waking at socially appropriate times, with otherwise normal sleep when the person is allowed to sleep on their own schedule; a sleep diary together with wrist actigraphy recorded over several weeks is the recommended assessment tool, with sleep timing calculated from days free of work or social commitments. Polysomnography is not indicated in routine assessment of DSPD and is used mainly to rule out other primary sleep disorders, such as sleep apnea.

DSPD is frequently misdiagnosed or dismissed. It has been named as one of the sleep disorders most commonly misdiagnosed as a primary psychiatric disorder. DSPD is often confused with psychophysiological insomnia, depression, psychiatric disorders such as schizophrenia or ADHD, other sleep disorders, or school refusal. Practitioners of sleep medicine point out the dismally low rate of accurate diagnosis of the disorder and have often asked for better physician education on sleep disorders.

=== Definition ===
According to the International Classification of Sleep Disorders, Revised (ICSD-R, 2001), circadian rhythm sleep disorders share a common underlying chronophysiologic basis:

The major feature of these disorders is a misalignment between the patient's sleep-wake pattern and the pattern that is desired or regarded as the societal norm... In most circadian rhythm sleep disorders, the underlying problem is that the patient cannot sleep when sleep is desired, needed or expected.

Incorporating minor updates (ICSD-3, 2014), the diagnostic criteria for delayed sleep phase disorder are:

1. An intractable delay in the phase of the major sleep period occurs in relation to the desired clock time, as evidenced by a chronic or recurrent (for at least three months) complaint of inability to fall asleep at a desired clock time together with the inability to awaken at a desired and socially acceptable time.
2. When not required to maintain a strict schedule, patients exhibit improved sleep quality and duration for their age and maintain a delayed phase of entrainment to local time.
3. Patients have little or no reported difficulty maintaining sleep once it has begun.
4. Patients have a relatively severe to absolute inability to advance the sleep phase to earlier hours by enforcing conventional sleep and wake times.
5. Sleep–wake logs and/or actigraphy monitoring for at least two weeks document a consistent habitual pattern of sleep onsets, usually later than 2 a.m., and lengthy sleeps.
6. Occasional noncircadian days may occur (i.e., sleep is "skipped" for an entire day and night plus some portion of the following day), followed by a sleep period of 12 to 18 hours.
7. The symptoms do not meet the criteria for any other sleep disorder causing inability to initiate sleep or excessive sleepiness.
8. If one of the following laboratory methods is used, it must demonstrate a significant delay in the timing of the habitual sleep period: (1) 24-hour polysomnographic monitoring (or two consecutive nights of polysomnography and an intervening multiple sleep latency test); (2) continuous temperature monitoring showing that the time of the absolute temperature nadir is delayed into the second half of the habitual (delayed) sleep episode.

Some people with the condition adapt their lives to the delayed sleep phase, avoiding morning business hours as much as possible. The ICSD's severity criteria are:

- Mild: Two-hour delay (relative to the desired sleep time) associated with little or mild impairment of social or occupational functioning.
- Moderate: Three-hour delay associated with moderate impairment.
- Severe: Four-hour delay associated with severe impairment.

Some features of DSPD that distinguish it from other sleep disorders are:

- People with DSPD have at least a normal—and often much greater than normal—ability to sleep during the morning and sometimes in the afternoon. In contrast, those with chronic insomnia do not find it much easier to sleep during the morning than at night.
- People with DSPD fall asleep at more or less the same time every night, and sleep comes quite rapidly if they go to bed near the time they usually do. Young children with DSPD resist going to bed before they are sleepy, but the bedtime struggles disappear if they are allowed to stay up until the time they usually fall asleep.
- DSPD patients usually sleep well and regularly when they can follow their own sleep schedule, e.g., on weekends and during vacations.
- DSPD is a chronic condition. In the ICSD criteria, symptoms must have been present for at least three months before a diagnosis of DSPD can be made.

The formal name established in the ICSD-3 is delayed sleep–wake phase disorder. Earlier, and still common, names include delayed sleep phase disorder (DSPD), delayed sleep phase syndrome (DSPS), delayed sleep phase type (DSPT), and circadian rhythm sleep disorder.

== Management ==
Treatment, a set of management techniques, is specific to DSPD. It is different from treatment of insomnia, and recognizes the patients' ability to sleep well on their own schedules, while addressing the timing problem. Success, if any, may be partial; for example, a patient who normally awakens at noon may only attain a wake time of 10 or 10:30 with treatment and follow-up. Being consistent with the treatment is paramount.

Before starting DSPD treatment, patients are often asked to spend at least a week sleeping regularly, without napping, whenever they wish. It is important that they start treatment well-rested.

=== Non-pharmacological ===
Techniques to shift the cycle to earlier times that do not require technology often involve gradually shifting the sleeping time earlier at a pace comfortable for the patient (melatonin may be used as an augment here).

One example of an artificial treatment strategy is light therapy (phototherapy), with either a bright white lamp providing 10,000 lux at a specified distance from the eyes or a wearable LED device providing 350–550 lux at a shorter distance. Sunlight can also be used. The light is typically timed for 30–90 minutes at the patient's usual time of spontaneous awakening, or shortly before (but not long before), which is in accordance with the phase response curve (PRC) for light. Only experimentation, preferably with specialist help, will show how great an advance is possible and comfortable. For maintenance, some patients must continue the treatment indefinitely; some may reduce the daily treatment to 15 minutes; others may use the lamp just a few days a week or just every third week. Whether the treatment succeeds is highly individual. Light therapy generally requires adding time to the patient's morning routine. Patients with a family history of macular degeneration are advised to consult an eye doctor. Morning light exposure is likely to be most helpful in advancing the circadian phase, or in adding to the phase-advancing effect of appropriately timed melatonin and of avoiding evening light, when it is delivered as soon as possible after waking. In the American Academy of Sleep Medicine practice parameters, both morning light exposure and properly timed melatonin administration are indicated for treatment of DSPD, with the optimal timing and dosing of each still to be determined.

Light restriction in the evening, sometimes called darkness therapy or scototherapy, is another treatment strategy. Just as bright light upon waking should advance one's sleep phase, bright light in the evening and night delays it. It is suspected that DSPD patients are overly sensitive to evening light. The photopigment of the retinal photosensitive ganglion cells, melanopsin, is excited by light mainly in the blue portion of the visible spectrum (absorption peaks at ~480 nanometers).

A formerly popular treatment, phase delay chronotherapy, is intended to reset the circadian clock by manipulating bedtimes. It consists of going to bed two or more hours later each day for several days until the desired bedtime is reached, and often must be repeated every few weeks or months to maintain results. Its safety is uncertain, notably because it has led to the development of non-24-hour sleep–wake disorder, a much more severe disorder.

Sleep deprivation with phase advance (SDPA) is a modified chronotherapy. One stays awake for a whole night and day, then goes to bed 90 minutes earlier than usual and maintains the new bedtime for a week. This process is repeated weekly until the desired bedtime is reached. Current treatment research encourages carefully timed melotinon intake, morning light exposure, evening light reduction, and constant/consistint sleep scheduling.

Earlier exercise and meal times can also help promote earlier sleep times.

=== Pharmacological ===
Aripiprazole (brand name Abilify) is an atypical antipsychotic that is effective in treating DSPD by advancing sleep onset, sleep midpoint, and sleep offset at relatively low doses (0.5–1 mg), though higher doses (1.5–3 mg) may cause paradoxical excessive sleepiness.

Agomelatine works on melatonin MT1 and MT2 receptors, alongside having antidepressant (antagonist) effects on the 5-HT2C receptor. It was used successfully in a case study of a man who acquired DSPD-like symptoms from a TBI. It is not currently approved for DSPD, and other evidence for its usage is scarce.

Aripiprazole and agomelatine are not established as first-line treatments for DSPD, although they appear as possible for experimental treatments.

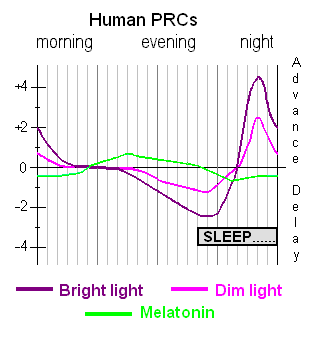
Phase response curves for light and for melatonin administration

Melatonin taken an hour or so before the usual bedtime may induce sleepiness. Taken this late, it does not in itself affect circadian rhythms, but decreased exposure to light in the evening is helpful in establishing an earlier pattern. In accordance with its phase response curve (PRC), a very small dose of melatonin can also, or instead, be taken 6–8 hours before sleep onset as an aid to advancing the circadian phase; it must then be small enough not to induce excessive sleepiness.

Melatonin is generally well tolerated: the most frequently reported side effects are headache and nasopharyngitis, no trial has documented a serious adverse effect, and strategically timed doses as low as 0.5 mg appear to be as effective as, and potentially less sedating than, larger doses. Large doses of melatonin can even be counterproductive: Lewy et al. support "the idea that too much melatonin may spill over onto the wrong zone of the melatonin phase-response curve." Long-term safety data are limited; two observational studies of long-term use in children and adolescents, with a median follow-up of four years, did not document safety concerns. In some countries, the hormone is available only by prescription or not at all. In the United States, Canada, and Germany, melatonin is on the shelf of most pharmacies and herbal stores.

The prescription medication ramelteon (Rozerem) is a melatonin analogue that selectively binds to the melatonin MT_{1} and MT_{2} receptors, which has led to the hypothesis that it could treat DSPD. Ramelteon's effectiveness has been contested, with studies often finding mixed results.

A review by the US Department of Health and Human Services found little difference between melatonin and placebo for most primary and secondary sleep disorders. The one exception, where melatonin is effective, is the "circadian abnormality" DSPD. Another systematic review found inconsistent evidence for melatonin's efficacy in treating DSPD in adults, and noted that it was difficult to draw conclusions about its efficacy because many recent studies on the subject were uncontrolled.

Modafinil (brand name Provigil) is a stimulant approved in the US for treatment of shift-work sleep disorder that shares some characteristics with DSPD. Some clinicians prescribe it for DSPD patients, as it may improve a sleep-deprived patient's ability to function adequately during socially desirable hours. It is generally not recommended to take modafinil after noon; it is a relatively long-acting drug with a half-life of 15 hours, and taking it during the later part of the day can make it harder to fall asleep at bedtime.

In the 1990s, vitamin B_{12} was suggested as a remedy for DSPD, and some sources still recommend it. Several case reports were published, but a 2007 American Academy of Sleep Medicine review concluded that it provided no benefit.

== Prognosis ==
The long-term course of DSPD is not well understood. It typically emerges in adolescence and may persist into adulthood if untreated. DSPD is a highly stable condition from late adolescence into early adulthood, with approximately 70% of cases persisting over this period. But its prevalence declines with age, falling from an estimated 3–7% in adolescence to <1% among adults aged 40–64. Persistence of DSPD has been associated with impaired behavioral regulation, specifically attention deficit hyperactivity disorder (ADHD), poor sleep hygiene, and gaming addiction.

A strict schedule and good sleep hygiene are essential in maintaining any good effects of treatment. With treatment, some people with mild DSPD may sleep and function well with an earlier sleep schedule. Caffeine and other stimulant drugs to keep a person awake during the day may be unnecessary and should be avoided in the afternoon and evening, in accordance with good sleep hygiene. A chief difficulty in treating DSPD is maintaining an earlier schedule after it has been established: relapse and decompensation after treatment are common, and patients are advised to expect this and return to their original treatment plan if it occurs.

Long-term success rates of treatment have seldom been evaluated, but experienced clinicians say that DSPD is extremely difficult to treat. One study of 61 DSPD patients, with average sleep onset at about 3 a.m. and average waking time of about 11:30 a.m., was followed by questionnaires for the subjects after a year. Good effect was seen during the six-week treatment with a large daily dose of melatonin. After ceasing melatonin use, over 90% had relapsed to pre-treatment sleeping patterns within the year, 29% reporting that the relapse occurred within one week. The mild cases retained changes significantly longer than the severe cases.

=== Adaptation to late sleeping times ===
Working the evening or night shift, or working at home, makes DSPD less of an obstacle for some.

Many of these people do not consider their pattern a disorder. Some nap, even taking 4–5 hours of sleep in the morning and 4–5 in the evening. DSPD-friendly careers can include security work, the entertainment industry, hospitality work in restaurants, theaters, hotels, bars, call center work, manufacturing, healthcare or emergency medicine, commercial cleaning, taxi or truck driving, the media, freelance writing, translation, IT work, or medical transcription. Other careers that emphasize early morning work hours, such as bakers, coffee baristas, pilots and flight crews, teachers, mail carriers, waste collection, and farming, can be particularly difficult for people who naturally sleep later than is typical. Some careers, such as over-the-road truck drivers, firefighters, law enforcement, and nursing, can be suitable for both people with DSPD and people with the opposite condition, advanced sleep phase disorder, as workers are needed both very early in the morning and late at night.

Some people with the disorder are unable to adapt to earlier sleeping times even after many years of treatment. Sleep researchers Dagan and Abadi have proposed that the existence of untreatable DSPD cases be formally recognized as a "sleep-wake schedule disorder (SWSD) disability", an invisible disability.

Rehabilitation for DSPD patients includes acceptance of the condition and a career that allows late sleeping times or flexible hours. In some schools and universities, students with DSPD have been able to arrange to take exams at times of day when their concentration levels may be good.

Patients suffering from SWSD disability should be encouraged to accept the fact that they suffer from a permanent disability, and that their quality of life can only be improved if they are willing to undergo rehabilitation. It is imperative that physicians recognize the medical condition of SWSD disability in their patients and bring it to the notice of the public institutions responsible for vocational and social rehabilitation.

In the US, the Americans with Disabilities Act of 1990 requires that employers make reasonable accommodations for employees with sleeping disorders. In the case of DSPD, this may require that the employer accommodate later working hours for jobs normally performed on a "9 to 5" schedule. The statute defines "disability" as a "physical or mental impairment that substantially limits one or more major life activities", and Section 12102(2)(a) itemizes sleep as a "major life activity".

=== Effect on patients ===
Lack of public awareness of the disorder contributes to the difficulties experienced by people with DSPD, who are commonly stereotyped as undisciplined or lazy. Parents may be chastised for not giving their children acceptable sleep patterns, and schools and workplaces rarely tolerate chronically late, absent, or sleepy students and workers, failing to see them as having a chronic condition.

By the time DSPD sufferers receive an accurate diagnosis, they often have been misdiagnosed or labelled as lazy and incompetent workers or students for years. Misdiagnosis of circadian rhythm sleep disorders as psychiatric conditions causes considerable distress to patients and their families, and leads to some patients being inappropriately prescribed psychoactive drugs. For many patients, diagnosis of DSPD is itself a life-changing breakthrough.

As DSPD is so little-known and so misunderstood, peer support may be important for information, self-acceptance, and future research studies.

People with DSPD who force themselves to follow a normal 9–5 workday "are not often successful and may develop physical and psychological complaints during waking hours, e.g., sleepiness, fatigue, headache, decreased appetite, or depressed mood. Patients with circadian rhythm sleep disorders often have difficulty maintaining ordinary social lives, and some of them lose their jobs or fail to attend school."

== Epidemiology ==
Several studies have attempted to estimate the prevalence of DSPD. Results vary due to differences in methods of data collection and diagnostic criteria. A particular difficulty is where to draw the line between extreme evening chronotypes and clinical DSPD. Using the ICSD-1 diagnostic criteria (edition ICSD-3), a 1993 study by telephone questionnaire of 7,700 randomly selected adults (aged 18–67) in Norway estimated the prevalence of DSPD at 0.17%. A similar 1999 study of 1,525 adults (aged 15–59) in Japan estimated its prevalence at 0.13%. A somewhat higher prevalence of 0.7% was found in a 1995 San Diego study. A 2014 study of 9,100 New Zealand adults (age 20–59) using a modified version of the Munich Chronotype Questionnaire found a DSPD prevalence of 1.5% to 8.9% depending on the strictness of the definition. A 2002 study of older adults (age 40–65) in San Diego found 3.1% had complaints of difficulty falling asleep at night and waking in the morning, but did not apply formal diagnostic criteria. Based on actigraphic recordings, the prevalence of definite DSPD in this sample was estimated at less than 1%.

A marked delay of sleep patterns is a normal feature of the development of adolescent humans. According to Mary Carskadon, both circadian phase and homeostasis (the accumulation of sleep pressure during the wake period) contribute to a DSPD-like condition in post-pubertal as compared to pre-pubertal youngsters. Adolescent sleep phase delay "is present both across cultures and across mammalian species" and "seems to be related to pubertal stage rather than age." As a result, diagnosable DSPD is much more prevalent among adolescents, with estimates ranging from 3.4% to 8.4% among high school students.

== History ==
DSPD was first formally described in 1981 by Elliot D. Weitzman and others at Montefiore Medical Center.

== See also ==
- Free-running sleep
- Chronobiology
- Cultural jet lag
- Irregular sleep–wake rhythm
- Morningness–eveningness questionnaire
- Non-24-hour sleep–wake disorder
- Seasonal affective disorder (SAD)
- Sleep inertia
