= Free-running sleep =

Shifting sleep pattern

Free-running sleep is a sleep pattern characterised by sleep times not entrained to normal time cues; often referring to a later shifting (delay) on a daily basis. This occurs as the circadian rhythm sleep disorder, non-24-hour sleep-wake rhythm disorder, or when artificially induced in experiments studying circadian rhythms and other biological rhythms within the field of chronobiology.

== Background ==
An individual's or organism's circadian phase can be determined by monitoring an output of the circadian system, the internal circadian clock. A researcher can precisely determine factors such as daily cycles of genetic activity, body temperature, blood pressure, hormone secretion, or sleep and activity/alertness patterns. Alertness can be tracked in humans through performance-based tests or other measures (such as somnolence), whereas in animals it can be assessed by observing trends in physical activity (for example, wheel-running in rodents).

=== In research settings ===
When humans or organisms free-run, experiments can be conducted to determine which signals, known as zeitgebers, are effective in entrainment. Study subjects are shielded from all time cues, often following protocols such as continuous light, continuous dark, or combined light/dark alternations to which the organism is unable to entrain; for example, a very short (or ultradian) period of one hour dark and two hours light. Other rhythm disruptions may be used, such as providing limited amounts at short intervals to avoid entrainment to average mealtimes. These modifications can show the strength and influence of the intrinsic circadian clock.

Researchers can conduct studies to measure entrainment for various organisms and the bounds of circadian cycle lengths. For example, some animals can be entrained to a 22-hour day, but not to a 20-hour day. Although previous consensus showed human cycles averaging as short as 23.5 hours, or as long as 24.65 hours, several more recent studies determined a tighter average range around 24.18 hours. Observations of free-running and circadian rhythm flexibility are also applicable to situations such as sleep during space travel, for example, for reduced day lengths required of astronauts over short periods, or when considering the length of day on a planet such as Mars (24.65 hours).

Masking refers to the effects of non-circadian factors within experiments which could obscure existing patterns or create the appearance of a non-existent rhythm, impacting measurement of timings. Some examples of masking factors include background noise, ambient temperature, distractions, lighting conditions, or boredom during the study.

== In humans ==
Non-24-hour sleep–wake disorder (Non-24 or N24), formerly referred to free-running disorder (FRD), is a circadian rhythm sleep disorder. The difference between circadian length and the 24-hour day, while inadequately synchronised by zeitgebers, results in free running. Non-24 affects more than half of people who are totally blind and a small number of sighted individuals.

Among blind people, the cause is the inability to adequately register light cues, preventing entrainment. Many blind people who are able to entrain to a 24-hour light/dark cycle retain functioning retinae, including operative non-visual light-sensitive cells called ipRGCs. These ganglion cells, which contain melanopsin, relay signals to the circadian clock via the retinohypothalamic tract (branching off from the optic nerve), which is the pathway from the retina to the pineal gland.

Among sighted individuals, non-24 usually first appears during the teens or early twenties. As with delayed sleep phase disorder (DSPS or DSPD), in the absence of neurological damage due to trauma or stroke, cases rarely develop after age 30. In a case review, non-24 affected more sighted men than sighted women. A quarter of sighted subjects with non-24 also have an associated psychiatric condition. A quarter previously showed symptoms of DSPS.

== See also ==
- Circadian rhythm
- Circadian rhythm sleep disorder
