= Irregular sleep–wake rhythm disorder =

Sleep disorder

- Other names: Circadian rhythm sleep disorder - irregular sleep-wake type
- Specialty: Sleep medicine, neurology, chronobiology

Irregular sleep–wake rhythm disorder (ISWRD) is a rare form of circadian rhythm sleep disorder. It is characterized by numerous naps throughout the 24-hour period, no main nighttime sleep episode, and irregularity from day to day. Affected individuals have no pattern of when they are awake or asleep, may have poor quality sleep, and often may be very sleepy while they are awake. The total time asleep per 24 hours is normal for the person's age. The disorder is serious—an invisible disability. It can create social, familial, and work problems, making it hard for a person to maintain relationships and responsibilities, and may make a person home-bound and isolated.

== Causes ==
ISWRD has various causes, including neurological disorders such as dementia (particularly Alzheimer's disease), brain damage, or intellectual disabilities. It is thought that those affected have a weak circadian clock and to involve altered levels of pineal melatonin, a hormone that signals biological night and suppresses the brain's wake-promoting signals. The risk for the disorder increases with age, but only due to increased prevalence of co-morbid medical disorders.

== Diagnosis ==
A sleep diary with night-time in the middle and the weekend in the middle, to better notice trends

A sleep diary should be kept to aid in diagnosis and for chronicling the sleep schedule during treatment. Other ways to monitor the sleep schedule are actigraphy or use of a Continuous Positive Airway Pressure (CPAP) machine that can log sleeping times.

The following are possible warning signs:

- sleeping off and on in a series of naps during the day and at night, with no regular pattern but with normal total sleep time
- difficulty getting restorative sleep
- excessive daytime sleepiness

Because of the changes in sleep/wake time, and because this is a rare disorder, initially it can seem like another circadian rhythm sleep disorder such as non-24-hour sleep–wake disorder or like insomnia.

=== Initial visit with sleep physician ===
A physician specializing in sleep medicine may ask patients about their medical history; for example: neurological problems, prescription or non-prescription medications taken, alcohol use, family history, and any other sleep problems. A thorough medical and neurological exam is indicated. The patient will be asked to complete a sleep diary, recording natural sleep and wake up times, over several weeks. Sleep rating with the Epworth Sleepiness Scale may be used.

=== Medical testing ===
A neurological condition or another medical problem may be suspected, in which case, blood tests, a CT scan or an MRI may be used. An overnight sleep study is usually not needed to detect this disorder, but may be indicated if other sleep disorders, such as sleep apnea and periodic limb movement disorder, seem likely. The overnight sleep study is called polysomnography. It charts brain waves, heart beat, muscle activity, and breathing during sleep. It also records arm and leg movement. It will show if there are other sleep disorders that are causing or increasing the problems with ISWRD.

== Management ==
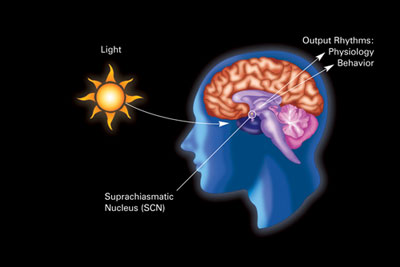
Circadian rhythm labeled

Treatment for irregular sleep–wake rhythm tries to enable the body clock in the brain, such that a normal long sleep period at night can be achieved.

=== Pharmacological ===
Melatonin serves as one of the primary pharmacological intervention for ISWRD and demonstrates efficacy across diverse clinical populations. However, a significant academic debate persists regarding the risk-benefit profile of its administration within certain vulnerable groups, including the elderly. Other drugs and supplements such as vitamin B_{12}, sleep aids, wake aids, and other medications may also be used.

The management of this disorder may vary for different subgroups of patients. Affected individuals with dementia should not be prescribed sleep-promoting medications (sedatives) for ISWRD due to the increased prevalence of adverse effects in this group outweighing the possible benefits.

=== Behavorial ===
Education about sleep hygiene is important, and counseling can be helpful.

Exposure to light during the daytime and activities occurring at regular times each day may help to restore a normal rhythm. The American Academy of Sleep Medicine has recommended light therapy with a 2500–5000 lux light source for between for 1–2 hours between 09:00–11:00 every day.

== Research ==
There is currently a great deal of active research on various aspects of circadian rhythm; this often occurs at major universities in conjunction with sleep research clinics at major hospitals. An example is the program with Harvard Medical School and Brigham and Women's Hospital. This research includes programs that are staffed by researchers from various departments at the university, including psychiatry, neurology, chemistry, biology. Other major sleep research centers are in Tel Aviv in Israel, Munich in Germany and in Japan.

A wide variety of sleep disorders are actively being researched. Measuring body temperature or melatonin levels may be used. Some hospitals do blood tests for melatonin levels. Saliva tests for melatonin are now available for online purchase; its metabolites can also be tested in urine.

== Nomenclature ==
The current formally correct name of the disorder is Irregular Sleep Wake Rhythm Disorder. This disorder has been referred to by many other terms, including: Irregular Sleep Wake Pattern, irregular sleep wake syndrome, Irregular Sleep Wake Cycle or Irregular Sleep Wake Schedule, and Irregular Sleep Wake Disorder (ISWD). Sometimes the words sleep and wake are hyphenated (sleep-wake), sometimes joined with an en dash (sleep–wake) and sometimes open (sleep wake). Sometimes the words are capitalized and sometimes they are not.

== See also ==
- Advanced sleep phase syndrome
- Chronobiology
- Circadian rhythm
- Delayed sleep phase disorder
