= Michael Terman =

American psychologist

Michael Terman is an American psychologist best known for his work in applying the biological principles of the circadian timing system to psychiatric treatments for depression and sleep disorders. This subspecialty is known as Chronotherapeutics.

== Education and career ==
Terman received an AB from Columbia College in 1964, and a ScM (1966) and PhD (1968) from Brown University in the field of physiological psychology. From 1969 to 1981, he served on the psychology faculties of Brown and Northeastern Universities. He then moved to Columbia, where he is a professor of Clinical Psychology in Psychiatry, with a joint appointment as a Research Scientist at the New York State Psychiatric Institute. He established the Clinical Chronobiology research program there in 1983 with funding from the National Institute of Mental Health. In 2004, the program evolved into the first hospital-based chronotherapeutics outpatient clinic in the United States, the Center for Light Treatment and Biological Rhythms at Columbia University Medical Center. In 1994, in parallel with his academic pursuits, he founded the Center for Environmental Therapeutics (CET), an independent, nonprofit international consortium of specialists in circadian biology, psychiatry and ophthalmology that provides chronotherapeutics education to both the lay public and clinicians. He serves as President of CET.

== Research ==
Before turning to clinical research, Terman's laboratory work focused on the effects of light-dark exposure and timing of food ingestion on circadian rhythm organization in animals. The hypothalamic internal “master” clock in the suprachiasmatic nuclei had recently been discovered, with a primary function of programming daily cycles of physiology and behavior even in the absence of day-night cues. In animals lacking the clock nuclei, they showed that circadian rhythms of visual sensitivity and anticipatory behavior for scheduled meals persisted, even though unrestricted feeding and drinking behavior became arrhythmic. This work contributed to the conception of “peripheral” internal clocks (e.g., in the retina and liver) that operate in a coordinated multiple-clock system. With Swiss colleagues Charlotte Remé and Anna Wirz-Justice, he published the 1991 empirical and theoretical synthesis, The Visual Input Stage of the Circadian Timing System.

After the discovery in the early 1980s of light therapy for seasonal affective disorder, at the National Institute of Mental Health, Terman turned to clinical therapeutics, with a focus on non-pharmacologic antidepressant responses to circadian light schedules. The lab developed “10,000 lux bright light therapy,” which became the standard regimen for brief morning light treatment to reset the internal clock at an earlier position in the 24-hour day. The method has been extended to treatment of nonseasonal depression, bipolar depression and depression during pregnancy. It has also been used to correct the insomnia associated with delayed sleep phase disorder.

Terman's animal studies showed that the internal circadian clock responds with high sensitivity to the small light level changes during gradual dawn and dusk transitions, independent of daytime lighting. In an extension to chronotherapeutics, his group designed a computerized twilight simulator for use in the bedroom. The dim incremental dawn signal, received through closed eyelids, exerts an antidepressant effect similar to post-awakening bright light therapy, and acts like bright light by resetting the circadian clock to an earlier hour.

Serendipitously, the lab discovered that a nonvisual environmental factor, negative air ion concentration, also has an antidepressant effect. Negative ions (in nature or from electronic air purifiers) had long been presumed to have a nonspecific positive effect on wellbeing, and might be exploited as a placebo control for light therapy. The lab tested low ion levels vs. high ion levels in a set of randomized, controlled, double-blind clinical trials. The high concentrations showed significantly greater antidepressant effect for both seasonal and nonseasonal depression, as well as when administered after waking or during sleep.

The lab also devised a formulation that mimics pineal melatonin production without spikes and with gradual washout corresponding to the natural nighttime pattern. When used several hours before sleep, it magnifies the clock resetting effect of light at wake-up, which is particularly useful for normalizing the sleep pattern in patients with delayed sleep phase disorder.

== Applied Chronotherapeutics ==
In 2009, Terman, with colleagues Anna Wirz-Justice (Basel) and Francesco Benedetti (Milan) published the first chronotherapeutics treatment manual for clinicians. With particular emphasis on bipolar depression, it explains how three non-pharmaceutical procedures can be combined to produce rapid remission from depression within a week or less. Patients receive up to three alternate nights of wake therapy (no sleep allowed) with light therapy each morning. Recovery sleep on alternate nights begins earlier than usual, but shifts over days to normal bedtime. The first U.S. clinic opened in Chicago, in collaboration with the Center for Environmental Therapeutics, in the fall of 2010.

Terman also devised a questionnaire that estimates the melatonin cycle so light therapy could be timed effectively without serial sampling of melatonin in the blood or saliva.

== Books ==
1. Wirz-Justice A, Benedetti F, Terman M (2009) Chronotherapeutics for Affective Disorders: A Clinician’s Manual for Light and Wake Therapy. Basel, Karger.
2. Terman M, McMahan I (2012) Chronotherapy: Resetting Your Inner Clock to Boost Mood, Alertness, and Quality Sleep. New York, Penguin.
