= Sleep journal =

Sleep journal may refer to:

- A sleep diary, a record of an individual's sleeping and waking times
- Sleep, a medical journal covering sleep research
