= Pittsburgh Sleep Quality Index =

Questionnaire that assesses sleep quality

- Purpose: assess sleep quality over 1 month

The Pittsburgh Sleep Quality Index (PSQI) is a self-report questionnaire that assesses sleep quality over a 1-month time interval. The measure consists of 19 individual items, creating 7 components that produce one global score, and takes 5–10 minutes to complete. Developed by researchers at the University of Pittsburgh, the PSQI is intended to be a standardized sleep questionnaire for clinicians and researchers to use with ease and is used for multiple populations. The questionnaire has been used in many settings, including research and clinical activities, and has been used in the diagnosis of sleep disorders. Clinical studies have found the PSQI to be reliable and valid in the assessment of sleep problems to some degree, but more so with self-reported sleep problems and depression-related symptoms than actigraphic measures.

== Development and history ==
The PSQI was developed in 1989, by Buysse and his colleagues, to create a standardized measure designed to gather consistent information about the subjective nature of people's sleep habits and provide a clear index that both clinicians and patients can use. It gained popularity as a measure that could be used in research that looks at how sleep might be associated with sleep disorders, depression, and bipolar disorder.

== Scoring and interpretation ==
Consisting of 19 items, the PSQI measures several different aspects of sleep, offering seven component scores and one composite score. The component scores consist of subjective sleep quality, sleep latency (i.e., how long it takes to fall asleep), sleep duration, habitual sleep efficiency (i.e., the percentage of time in bed that one is asleep), sleep disturbances, use of sleeping medication, and daytime dysfunction.

Each item is weighted on a 0–3 interval scale. The global PSQI score is then calculated by totaling the seven component scores, providing an overall score ranging from 0 to 21, where lower scores denote a healthier sleep quality.

Traditionally, the items from the PSQI have been summed to create a total score to measure overall sleep quality. Statistical analyses also support looking at three factors, which include sleep efficiency (using sleep duration and sleep efficiency variables), perceived sleep quality (using subjective sleep quality, sleep latency, and sleep medication variables), and daily disturbances (using sleep disturbances and daytime dysfunctions variables).

== Reliability ==
Evaluation of norms and reliability for the Pittsburgh Sleep Quality Index*
Criterion	Rating (adequate, good, excellent, too good*)	Explanation with references
Norms	TBD	TBD
Internal consistency (Cronbach's alpha, split half, etc.)	Adequate	A meta-analysis showed that nine studies contained Cronbach's alpha coefficients greater than or equal to 0.70.
Inter-rater reliability	TBD	The PSQI is a relatively new assessment. Not enough research has been conducted on inter-rater reliability to give a comprehensive rating.
Test-retest reliability	Adequate	Two of the studies reported the intraclass correlation coefficient of greater than or equal to 0.70 over a period of several weeks.
Test-repeatability	TBD	Like inter-rater reliability, limited research is available on test-repeatability.

*Table from Youngstrom et al., extending Hunsley & Mash, 2008

== Validity ==
Evaluation of validity and utility for the Pittsburgh Sleep Quality Index*
Criterion	Rating (adequate, good, excellent, too good*)	Explanation with references
Content validity	Adequate	The PSQI's seven component scores concern multiple sleep quality aspects.
Construct validity (e.g., predictive, concurrent, convergent, and discriminant validity)	Good	Measure shows strong correlation with related sleep constructs and poor correlation with unrelated constructs.
Discriminative validity	Good	Comparisons of PSQI scores between poor and good sleepers show significant differences in scores.
Validity generalization	TBD	PSQI has been used in multiple non-clinical populations, but two people with the same sleep quality rating may have different symptoms.
Treatment sensitivity	TBD	The original study showed a sensitivity of 89.6%, but not enough research has been conducted to determine sensitivity across multiple studies.
Clinical utility	TBD	TBD

*Table from Youngstrom et al., extending Hunsley & Mash, 2008

== Impact ==
The PSQI now is used by researchers working with people from adolescence to late life. The PSQI is recommended in independent reviews because it has accumulated a substantial amount of research evidence. In addition to the measure's promising reliability and validity, its brevity and accessibility as a free measure allow the measure great potential for clinical practice. To date, it has been translated into 56 languages. The PSQI in Bengali language is also abbreviated as BPSQI where 'B' stands for Bengali.

== Limitations ==
The PSQI has the same problems as other self-report inventories in that scores can be easily exaggerated or minimized by the person completing them. Like all questionnaires, the way the instrument is administered can have an effect on the final score. The PSQI is a relatively new measure and as a result has not received enough investigation to determine the entirety of the psychometric measures.

== See also ==
- Epworth Sleepiness Scale
