= Entrainment (chronobiology) =

Biological rhythms in chronobiology

In the study of chronobiology, entrainment refers to the synchronization of a biological clock to an environmental cycle. An example is the interaction between circadian rhythms and environmental cues, such as light and temperature. Entrainment helps organisms adapt their bodily processes according to the timing of a changing environment. For example, entrainment is manifested during travel between time zones, hence why humans experience jet lag.

Biological rhythms are endogenous; they persist even in the absence of environmental cues as they are driven by an internal mechanism, most notably the circadian clock. Of the several possible cues (known as zeitgebers, German for 'time-givers') that can contribute to entrainment of the circadian clock, light has the greatest impact. Units of circadian time (CT) are used to describe entrainment to refer to the relationship between the rhythm and the light signal/pulse.

== Modes of entrainment ==
There are two general modes of entrainment: phasic and continuous. The phasic mode is when there is limited interaction with the environment to "reset" the clock every day by the amount equal to the "error", which is the difference between the environmental cycle and the organism's circadian rhythm. Exposure to certain environmental stimuli will cause a phase shift, an abrupt change in the timing of the rhythm. The continuous mode is when the circadian rhythm is continuously adjusted by the environment, usually by constant light. Two properties, the free-running period of an organism, and the phase response curve, are the main pieces of information needed to investigate individual entrainment. There are also limits to entrainment. Although there may be individual differences in this limit, most organisms have a +/- 3 hours limit of entrainment. Due to this limit, it may take several days for re-entrainment.

== Mechanisms of entrainment ==
The activity/rest cycle (sleep) in animals is one of the circadian rhythms that normally are entrained by environmental cues. In mammals, such endogenous rhythms are generated by the suprachiasmatic nucleus (SCN) of the anterior hypothalamus. Entrainment is accomplished by altering the concentration of clock components through altered gene expression and protein stability.

Circadian oscillations occur even in the cells of isolated organs such as the liver/heart as peripheral oscillators, and it is believed that they sync up with the master pacemaker in the mammalian brain, the SCN. Such hierarchical relationships are not the only ones possible: two or more oscillators may couple in order to assume the same period without either being dominant over the other(s). This situation is analogous to pendulum clocks.

== Health implications ==
When good sleep hygiene is insufficient, a person's lack of synchronization to night and day can have health consequences. There is some variation within normal chronotypes' entrainment; it is normal for humans to awaken anywhere from about 5 a.m. to 9 a.m. However, patients with DSPD, ASPD and non-24-hour sleep–wake disorder are improperly entrained to light/dark.

== Applications of entrainment ==
Entrainment is used in various fields to optimize performance and health. In sports, it helps athletes adjust to new time zones quickly. In medicine, light therapy is used to treat circadian rhythm disorders. The principles of entrainment are also applied in occupational health to design better shift work schedules.

== See also ==
- Crepuscular – Animals active at twilight (i.e., dusk and dawn).
- Diurnality – Animals active during the day and sleeping at night.
- Nocturnality – Animal activity of sleeping during the day and active at night.
