= Jet lag =

Condition due to travel across time zones

- Other names: Desynchronosis, circadian dysrhythmia
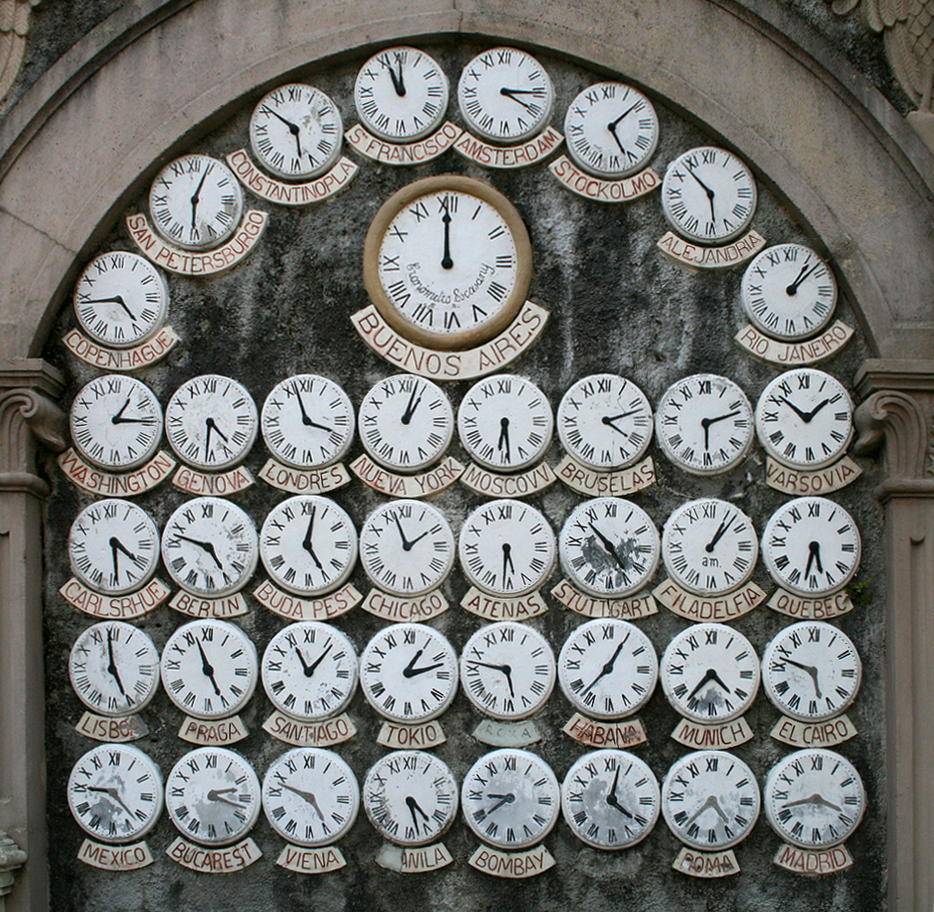
- World clocks
- Specialty: Psychiatry, neurology, aviation medicine, sleep medicine

Jet lag (Note: Also known as desynchronosis or circadian dysrhythmia) is a temporary physiological condition that occurs when a person's circadian rhythm is out of sync with the time zone they are in, and is a typical result from travelling rapidly across multiple time zones (east–west or west–east). For example, someone travelling from New York to London, i.e. from west to east, feels as if the time were five hours earlier than local time, and someone travelling from London to New York, i.e. from east to west, feels as if the time were five hours later than local time. The phase shift when travelling from east to west is referred to as phase-delay of the circadian cycle, whereas going west to east is phase-advance of the cycle. Most travellers find that it is harder to adjust time zones when travelling east. Jet lag is caused by a misalignment between the internal circadian clock and the external environment, and it has been classified within the category of a circadian rhythm sleep disorder, reflecting its basis in disrupted biological timing rather than general travel fatigue.

The condition may last several days before a traveller becomes fully adjusted to a new time zone; it takes on average one day per hour of time zone change to reach circadian re-entrainment. Jet lag is especially an issue for airline pilots, aircraft crew, and frequent travellers. Airlines have regulations aimed at combating pilot fatigue caused by jet lag.

Jet lag has been the subject of research across multiple fields including chronobiology, sleep medicine, and aviation health. Numerous peer-reviewed studies have examined its underlying mechanisms, health implications, and treatment strategies. Research efforts are ongoing, particularly within laboratories focused on circadian biology and sleep disorders, reflecting the condition's relevance to both clinical practice and occupational health.

The term jet lag was created after the arrival of jet aircraft, because prior to that it was uncommon to travel far and fast enough to cause the condition (most long distance travel was done by sea and rail).

== Discovery ==
According to a 1969 study by the Federal Aviation Administration, aviator Wiley Post was the first to write about the effects of flying across time zones in his 1931 co-authored book, Around the World in Eight Days. Jet lag started to be associated with circadian rhythms in the 1970s with the rise of entrainment and phase shift research, mimicking similar symptoms to jet lag when rhythms were disrupted. These associations began the official recognition of jet lag as an effect of circadian disruption rather than a factor of travel fatigue.

The term jet lag is inspired by how people feel after travelling rapidly over several time zones, typically on a plane or jet-like form of transportation. The body's feeling of having to adjust to the new time zone serves as the inspiration for the "lag" component of the term. The term's first use was found in a Los Angeles Times article on February 13, 1966. Horace Sutton wrote, "If you're going to be a member of the Jet Set and fly off to Katmandu for coffee with King Mahedra, you can count on contracting Jet lag, a debility not unakin to a hangover. Jet Lag derives from the simple fact that jets travel so fast they leave your rhythms behind." The term began gaining popularity soon after, continuing to increase to this day.

== Signs and symptoms ==
The symptoms of jet lag can be quite varied, depending on the amount of time zone alteration, time of day, and individual differences. Sleep disturbance occurs, with poor sleep upon arrival or sleep disruptions such as trouble falling asleep (when flying east), early awakening (when flying west), and trouble remaining asleep. Cognitive effects include poorer performance on mental tasks and concentration; dizziness, nausea, insomnia, confusion, anxiety, increased fatigue, headaches, and irritability; and problems with digestion, including indigestion, changes in the frequency and consistency of bowel movements, and reduced appetite. The symptoms are caused by a circadian rhythm that is out of sync with the day–night cycle of the destination, as well as the possibility of internal desynchronisation. Jet lag has been measured with simple analogue scales, but a study has shown that these are relatively blunt for assessing all the problems associated with jet lag. The Liverpool Jet Lag Questionnaire was developed to measure all the symptoms of jet lag at several times of day, and has been used to assess jet lag in athletes.

Jet lag may require three or more hours of time zone change to occur, but some individuals can be affected by a single hour of time zone change which can include the single-hour shift to or from daylight saving time. Symptoms and consequences of jet lag can be a significant concern for athletes travelling east or west to competitions, as performance is often dependent on a combination of physical and mental characteristics that are affected by jet lag. This is often a common concern at international sporting events like the Olympics and FIFA World Cup. However many athletes arrive at least 2–4 weeks ahead of these events, to help adjust from any jet lag issues.

=== Travel fatigue ===
Travel fatigue is general fatigue, disorientation, and headache caused by a disruption in routine, time spent in a cramped space with little chance to move around, a low-oxygen environment, and dehydration caused by dry air and limited food and drink. It does not necessarily involve the shift in circadian rhythms that cause jet lag. Travel fatigue can occur without crossing time zones, and it often disappears after one day accompanied by a night of good quality sleep.

Frequent traveller to Australia, British businessman Alistair McAlpine (1942–2014), wrote of the benefits of being awake at unusual hours in a 2002 memoir:

Possibly the only advantage of jet lag is that you are fully awake at times of the night when you would otherwise be unaware there was anything worth waking to see: the last hours of full moon, for instance, as it hovers over Sydney Harbour (..) Then there is the freshness as you walk in the Botanical Gardens, a freshness that only comes with dawn, a few moments caught between the stifling heat of antipodean night and the blazing sun of day.

== Cause ==
Jet lag is a chronobiological problem, similar to issues often induced by shift work and circadian rhythm sleep disorders. During jet lag, there is a shift in the sleep-wake cycle, disrupting the coordinated regulation of the suprachiasmatic nucleus (SCN) of the hypothalamus. The output of the SCN influences oscillatory sleep and arousal controls, which can later lead to an effect on daily sleep-wake behavior. When travelling across a number of time zones, a person's body clock (circadian rhythm) will be out of synchronisation with the destination time, as it experiences daylight and darkness contrary to the rhythms to which it was accustomed. The body's natural pattern is disturbed, as the rhythms that dictate times for eating, sleeping, hormone regulation, body temperature variation, and other functions no longer correspond to the environment, nor to each other in some cases. To the degree that the body cannot immediately realign these rhythms, it is jet lagged.

The speed at which the body adjusts to a new rhythm depends on the individual as well as the direction of travel; some people may require several days to adjust to a new time zone, while others experience little disruption.

Crossing the International Date Line does not in itself contribute to jet lag, as the guide for calculating jet lag is the number of time zones crossed, with a maximum possible time difference of plus or minus 12 hours. If the absolute time difference between two locations is greater than 12 hours, one must subtract 24 from or add 24 to that number. For example, the time zone UTC+14 will be at the same time of day as UTC−10, though the former is one day ahead of the latter.

Jet lag is linked only to the distance travelled along the east–west axis. A ten-hour flight between Europe and southern Africa does not cause jet lag, as the direction of travel is primarily north–south, though travel fatigue (as described in the previous section) might occur due to the disruptive physical effects of the trip itself. A four-hour flight between Miami, Florida, and Phoenix, Arizona, in the United States may result in jet lag, as the direction of travel is primarily east–west.

=== Risk factors ===
Jet lag has a stronger impact when crossing more time zones over a few days. If someone has had jet lag before, then they are likely to have it again. Additional factors include arrival time, age, stress levels, sleep before travel, and use of caffeine or alcohol. Those over the age of 60 are more sensitive to circadian rhythm changes.

Additionally, insufficient sleep before a flight can exacerbate jet lag symptoms. A well-rested state prior to travel helps the body adapt more efficiently to new time zones. High stress levels can also disrupt the body's natural rhythms, making it more difficult to adjust to a new time zone. Stress-induced hormonal changes may interfere with sleep quality and circadian alignment. Personal factors such as chronotype (morningness or eveningness preference), genetic predispositions, and overall health can affect how one experiences jet lag. For instance, individuals with a natural tendency to stay up late may find it easier to adjust to westward travel.

=== Double desynchronisation ===
Double desynchronisation is the misalignment between: The body's internal clocks and the external environment (e.g., local time at your travel destination) and the body's central and peripheral circadian clocks (i.e., misalignment within different parts of your own body).

There are two separate processes related to biological timing: circadian oscillators and homeostasis. The master clock of the circadian system is located in the suprachiasmatic nucleus (SCN) in the hypothalamus of the brain. There are also peripheral oscillators in other tissues and organs, each having their own oscillatory rates that could be synchronized to the SCN oscillatory rate. The SCN's role is to send signals to the peripheral oscillators, which synchronise them for physiological functions. The SCN responds to light information sent from the retina and entrains its circadian rhythm to the external environment. It is hypothesised that peripheral oscillators respond to internal signals such as hormones, food intake, and "nervous stimuli" and may take longer time to synchronize to local time.

The implication of independent internal clocks may explain some of the symptoms of jet lag. People who travel across several time zones can, within a few days, adapt their master clock SCN with light from the environment earlier. However, their skeletal muscles, liver, lungs, and other organs may adapt at different rates (peripheral circadian clocks may lag behind). This internal biological de-synchronisation is exacerbated as the body is not in sync with the environment – a double desynchronisation, which has implications for health and mood.

=== Entrainment to a local time ===
Entrainment to a local time zone refers to the synchronization of an individual's internal circadian rhythms to the external environment's 24-hour cycle, particularly in relation to light-dark cues (zeitgebers). This process is critical for overcoming jet lag, which occurs when a person's endogenous circadian timing becomes misaligned with the new local time following transmeridian travel.

Circadian rhythms in humans are generated by the suprachiasmatic nuclei (SCN) of the hypothalamus and are typically slightly longer than 24 hours, requiring daily resetting by external cues to maintain alignment with the environment. Light is the most powerful zeitgeber, and its timing, intensity, and spectral composition are key determinants of circadian phase adjustments. The effect of light on circadian rhythms is described by the Phase Response Curve (PRC), which illustrates how light exposure at different subjective times produces phase advances or delays. A phase-advance happens when your internal clock shifts to an earlier time—you go to sleep and wake up earlier than usual. A phase-delay happens when your internal clock shifts to a later time—you go to sleep and wake up later than usual. Light exposure in the early biological morning tends to advance the circadian phase, whereas exposure in the late biological evening delays it.

When individuals arrive in a new time zone, their internal biological night may still coincide with local daytime hours. Adaptation thus requires a shift in circadian phase to realign internal rhythms with the external light-dark cycle. For example, a study using bright light exposure (1,200–3,000 lux) demonstrated that strategically timed light can induce phase shifts of several hours, facilitating adaptation to new time zones.

Entrainment is also influenced by additional zeitgebers such as meal timing, scheduled activity, and chronopharmacological agents like melatonin. Melatonin, a hormone secreted during biological night, exhibits a PRC that is roughly opposite to that of light: it advances circadian rhythms when taken in the afternoon or early evening and delays them when taken in the morning. This complementarity allows for the combined use of light and melatonin to optimize re-entrainment.

However, individual variability plays a substantial role. Factors such as age, diurnal preference (chronotype), and genetic polymorphisms (e.g., in the PER gene) can affect how quickly one adapts, also in relation to the direction of travel (east-west or west-east). Older adults tend to have an earlier phase angle of entrainment and may show a leftward shift in their PRC, meaning their window for phase shifting occurs earlier relative to clock time than in younger adults.

== Health effects of chronic jet lag ==
=== Mental health implications ===
Jet lag may affect the mental health of vulnerable individuals. When travelling across time zones, there is a "phase-shift of body temperature, rapid-eye-movement sleep, melatonin production, and other circadian rhythms". A 2002 study found that relapse of bipolar and psychotic disorders occurred more frequently when seven or more time zones had been crossed in the past week than when three or fewer had been crossed. Although significant circadian rhythm disruption has been documented as affecting individuals with bipolar disorder, an Australian team studied suicide statistics from 1971 to 2001 to determine whether the one-hour shifts involved in daylight saving time had an effect. They found increased incidence of male suicide after the commencement of daylight saving time but not after returning to standard time.

=== Obesity and type 2 diabetes ===
Constant disruption caused by chronic jet lag can cause complications to the daily metabolic cycle of an individual due to a hinted link between circadian rhythm and metabolic/epigenetic mechanisms. This is due to the process of food intake acting as a Zeitgeber towards the circadian mechanisms and their control on the metabolic systems. The multiple disruptions of the circadian clock due to chronic jet lag alter eating habits causing irregular eating times, over/under eating, and metabolic inconsistencies that lead to a higher risk of type 2 diabetes and obesity.

=== Cancer ===
Research on animal models have shown that cancer growth has a potential link to chronic jet lag's effect on the circadian rhythm due to constant disruption. This is due to the nature of jet lag's ability to disturb molecular structures clocks and that include cells within the body. The circadian rhythm regulates the pace of cell processes such as decay and growth, and a disturbance towards the circadian rhythm is theorized to insight tumor growth. This is of even more concern for scientists when looking at immune cells which are told to be heavily dependent on its molecular clock and now risk tumor growth and decrease functionality due to chronic jet lag.

=== Chronic inflammation ===
Recent studies have demonstrated the delicate balance that circadian rhythm provides towards gut-microbiome. Chronic circadian rhythm disruption introduces a variety of disturbances within the gut that can potentially cause a multitude of issues such as inflammation. This is due to what researchers call a misalignment of regulatory clocks that control metabolic processes that spike insulin levels when there's an irregular timing of food intake causing inflammation. Researchers have long believed in the correlation of proper circadian balance, the disruption of the balance and its side effects, and metabolism, though more research is needed to understand underlying mechanisms.

== Management ==
=== Light exposure ===
Light is the most powerful external cue–known as Zeitgeber–for synchronizing a person's circadian rhythm to a new time zone. Timed light exposure can significantly affect a traveler's ability to adapt to a new time zone and reduce jet lag severity. The effectiveness of light as a chronotherapeutic intervention depends on several factors including direction of travel, chronotype, and the traveler's planned activities at the final destination.

Exposure to morning light can help advance an individual's circadian phase, making it easier for them to fall asleep earlier. This is useful for eastward travel since an individual will gain time in their final destination. Similarly, exposure to evening light can delay the phase, which is beneficial for westward travel since time will be lost at the final destination.

Strict adherence to timing is required for timed light exposure since it can be effective to help people match their circadian rhythms with the expected cycle at their destination. Light therapy is a popular method used by professional athletes to reduce jet lag. Timed correctly, the light may contribute to an advance or delay of the circadian phase to match the destination. To aid in timing, the US Centers for Disease Control and Prevention (CDC) recommends mobile apps which use personalized algorithms to suggest for the correct timing of light exposure and avoidance, when to use caffeine, and when to sleep.

=== Melatonin administration ===
Melatonin, a hormone secreted by the pineal gland in response to darkness, serves as a biological signal of night. In contrast to light, which suppresses melatonin and delays sleep onset, exogenous melatonin can phase-shift the circadian clock by mimicking nighttime, making it an effective chronopharmacological agent for realigning circadian rhythms. Melatonin receptors are situated on the SCN, which is the anatomical site of the circadian clock. The results of a few field studies of melatonin administration, monitoring circadian phase, have provided evidence for a correlation between the reduction of jet lag symptoms and the accelerated realignment of the circadian clock. When administered exogenously, via melatonin pills or melatonin gummies, it can advance or delay the circadian phase and help travelers shift faster and sleep better as they are transitioning between time zones.

The efficacy of melatonin depends on the dosage, timing, and individual response to it. If taken early in the evening at the final destination, especially when traveling east, melatonin can help promote sleep and shift the circadian rhythm earlier. Conversely, taking it in the morning instead may delay rhythm and slow adaptation to the new eastern time zone. In addition to the concern around appropriate timing of melatonin use, the legality of the substance in certain countries is also a variable to consider. For athletes, anti-doping agencies may prohibit or limit its use, preventing them from adapting to new time zones when traveling for games and performing optimally.

=== Short duration trips ===
In the case of short duration trips, jet lag may be minimized by maintaining a sleep-wake schedule based on the originating time zone after arriving at the destination, but this strategy is often impractical in regard to desired social activities or work obligations. Alternatively, shifting one's sleep schedule before departure by 1–2 hours to match the destination time zone may also shorten the duration of jet lag. Especially when combined with targeted light exposure and melatonin, symptoms can be further reduced through a combination of artificial exposure to light and rescheduling, as these have been shown to augment phase-shifting.

=== Pharmaceutical treatment ===
The short-term use of hypnotic medication has shown efficacy in reducing insomnia related to jet lag. In a study, zolpidem improved sleep quality and reduced awakenings for people travelling across five to nine time zones. The potential adverse effects of hypnotic agents, like amnesia and confusion, have led some doctors to advise patients to test such medications prior to using them for treating jet lag. Several cases using triazolam to promote sleep during a flight reported dramatic global amnesia.

Cordycepin, a derivative of a natural fungal compound, has been shown to be a potential modulator of the circadian clock. Administration of synthetic cordycepin in mice accelerated circadian re-entrainment following an abrupt shift in the light-dark cycle. The compound was found to interact with the RUVBL2 protein, which influences gene transcription associated with circadian timing. These findings suggest a possible future application of circadian-targeting compounds as pharmacological therapeutics for jet lag and other circadian sleep-wake disorders.

In February 2026, Japanese scientists discovered an oral compound called Mic-628 that can reset the body's internal clock by targeting the Period1 (Per1) gene, effectively cutting jet lag recovery time in half. The study demonstrated that a single dose could advance circadian rhythms regardless of when it was administered, offering a more reliable alternative to light therapy or melatonin for travelers and shift workers.

== See also ==
- Chronodisruption
- Shift work sleep disorder
- Sleep deprivation
