= Sleep hygiene =

Set of practices around healthy sleeping

- Specialty: Clinical psychology
- MeSH: D000070263

Centers for Disease Control and Prevention (CDC) recommendations for the amount of sleep needed decrease with age. While sleep quantity is important, good sleep quality is also essential to avoid sleep disorders.

Sleep hygiene is a behavioral and environmental practice developed in the late 1970s as a method to help people with mild to moderate insomnia. Clinicians assess the sleep hygiene of people with insomnia and other conditions, such as depression, and offer recommendations based on the assessment.

Sleep hygiene recommendations include establishing a regular sleep schedule, taking no or short naps, not exercising physically (or mentally) too close to bedtime, limiting worry, limiting exposure to light in the hours before sleep, and getting out of bed if sleep does not come. Additionally, use of the bed for anything but sleep and sex, avoiding alcohol (as well as nicotine, caffeine, and other stimulants) in the hours before bedtime, and having a peaceful, comfortable and dark sleep environment, are other hygiene recommendations.

== Assessment ==
Assessment of sleep hygiene includes a clinical interview and self-report questionnaires and sleep diaries, which are typically kept from one to two weeks, to record a representative sample of data. There are also computerized assessments such as the Sleep-EVAL system, which can be employed in the diagnostic process. It features 1,543 possible questions automatically selected according to the individual's previous answers.

Practice of sleep hygiene and knowledge of sleep hygiene practices can be assessed with measures such as the Sleep Hygiene Index, Sleep Hygiene Awareness and Practice Scale, or the Sleep Hygiene Self-Test. For younger individuals, sleep hygiene can be assessed by the Adolescent Sleep Hygiene Scale, the Children's Sleep Hygiene Scale, or Tayside children's sleep questionnaire.

== Recommendations ==
Clinicians choose among recommendations for improving sleep quality for each individual.

=== Sleep schedule ===
Awakening around the same time every morning and keeping a regular sleep schedule tends to improve sleep.

Getting 7 to 8 hours of sleep can help prevent various physical and mental health deficits, and therefore a top sleep hygiene recommendation is allowing enough time for sleep. Clinicians will frequently advise that these hours of sleep be obtained at night instead of through napping, because while naps can be helpful after sleep deprivation, in the long term, naps may be detrimental to nighttime sleep. Negative effects of napping on sleep and performance have been found to depend on duration and timing, with shorter midday naps being the least disruptive.

=== Activities ===
Exercise is an activity that can facilitate or inhibit sleep quality; people who exercise experience better quality of sleep than those who do not, but exercising too late in the day can be activating and delay falling asleep. Increasing exposure to bright and natural light during the daytime and avoiding bright light in the hours before bedtime may help promote a sleep-wake schedule aligned with nature's daily light-dark cycle.

Activities that reduce physiological arousal and cognitive activity promote falling asleep, so engaging in relaxing activities before bedtime is recommended. Conversely, continuing important work activities or planning shortly before bedtime or once in bed has been shown to delay falling asleep. Similarly, good sleep hygiene involves minimizing time spent thinking about worries or anything emotionally upsetting shortly before bedtime. Trying purposefully to fall asleep may induce frustration that further prevents falling asleep, so in such situations a person may be advised to get out of bed and try something else for a brief amount of time.

Generally, for people experiencing sleep difficulties, spending less time in bed results in deeper and more continuous sleep, so clinicians will frequently recommend eliminating the use of the bed for any activities except sleep or sex.

=== Foods and substances ===
Avoiding nicotine, caffeine (including coffee, energy drinks, soft drinks, tea, chocolate, and some pain relievers), and other stimulants in the hours before bedtime is recommended by most sleep hygiene specialists, as these substances activate neurobiological systems that maintain wakefulness. Alcohol near bedtime is frequently discouraged by clinicians, because, although alcohol can induce sleepiness initially, the arousal caused by metabolizing alcohol can disrupt and significantly fragment sleep. Smoking tobacco products before bed may reduce one's quality of resting by decreasing the time spent in deep sleep, leading to sleep fragmentation and nocturnal restlessness. Both consuming a large meal just before bedtime and experincing hunger have been associated with disrupted sleep; clinicians may recommend eating a light snack before bedtime. Limiting intake of liquids before bedtime can prevent interruptions of sleep due to urination.

=== Sleep environment ===
Arranging a sleep environment that is quiet, very dark, and cool is recommended. Noises, light, and uncomfortable temperatures have been shown to disrupt continuous sleep. Other recommendations that are frequently made, though less studied, include selecting comfortable mattresses, bedding, and pillows, and eliminating a visible bedroom clock, to prevent focusing on time passing when trying to fall asleep.

Light exposure when sleeping has been shown to cause ocular fatigue.

In 2015, a systematic review of studies on mattresses concluded that medium-firm, custom-inflated mattresses were best for pain and neutral spinal alignment.

== Effectiveness ==
Sleep hygiene studies use different sets of sleep hygiene recommendations, and the evidence that improving sleep hygiene improves sleep quality is weak and inconclusive as of 2014. Most research on sleep hygiene principles has been conducted in clinical settings, and there is a need for more research on non-clinical populations.

The strength of research support for each recommendation varies; some of the more robustly researched and supported recommendations include the negative effects of noisy sleep environments, alcohol consumption in the hours before sleep, engaging in mentally difficult tasks before sleep, and trying too hard to fall asleep. There is a lack of evidence for the effects of certain sleep hygiene recommendations, including getting a more comfortable mattress, removing bedroom clocks, not worrying, and limiting liquids. Other recommendations, such as the effects of napping or exercise, have a more complicated evidence base. The effects of napping, for example, seem to depend on the length and timing of napping, in conjunction with how much cumulative sleep an individual has had in recent nights.

There is support showing positive sleep outcomes for people who follow more than one sleep hygiene recommendation. There is, however, no evidence that poor sleep hygiene can contribute to insomnia.

While there is inconclusive evidence that sleep hygiene alone is effective as a treatment for insomnia, some research studies have shown improvement in insomnia for patients who receive sleep hygiene education in combination with cognitive behavioral therapy practices.

The American Academy of Sleep Medicine released in 2021 a meta-analysis on behavioral therapies concluding that they "did not favor the use of sleep hygiene as a stand-alone therapy for chronic insomnia" since "recent evidence shows that it is no longer supported as a single-component therapy". They further recommend educating clinicians and patients to avoid the recommendation of sleep hygiene as this can cause a "delayed implementation of effective therapies with continued or worsening insomnia symptoms" and furthermore may demotivate patients from "undergoing other treatments based on their experience using an ineffective intervention". It was also impossible to conduct a network analysis of the efficacy of specific items of sleep hygiene due to the wide heterogeneity and lack of systematic reporting of content and delivery methods.

== Special populations ==
Sleep hygiene is a central component of cognitive behavioral therapy for insomnia. Specific sleep disorders may require other or additional treatment approaches, and continuing difficulties with sleep may require additional assistance from healthcare providers.

College students are at risk of engaging in poor sleep hygiene and also of being unaware of the resulting effects of sleep deprivation. Because of irregular weekly schedules and the campus environment, college students may be likely to have variable sleep-wake schedules across the week, take naps, drink caffeine or alcohol near bedtime, and sleep in disruptive sleeping environments. Because of this, researchers recommend sleep hygiene education on college campuses. Harvard University, for example, requires all incoming first-year undergraduates to take a short online course on the subject before the fall semester begins.

Similarly, shift workers have difficulty maintaining a healthy sleep-wake schedule due to night or irregular work hours. Shift workers need to be strategic about napping and drinking caffeine, as these practices may be necessary for work productivity and safety, but should be timed carefully. Because shift workers may need to sleep while other individuals are awake, additional sleeping environment changes should include reducing disturbances by turning off phones and posting signs on bedroom doors to inform others when they are sleeping.

Additionally, socioeconomic status (SES) often determines access to care leading to a downward trajectory in health. Those with lower SES have limited access to quality living conditions. Economic status can contribute to tremendous stress. Sleep is the primary mechanism in biological and psychosocial stressors that can help one recover from moderate stress. However, the stress level will affect the brain by disrupting the circadian cycle, meaning that more stress will lead to more sleep disturbances. The data points to an inverse relationship: lower SES will result in insufficient sleep and a decline in sleep quality compared to high SES. Light and noise will significantly impact one's sleeping patterns. Exposure to light will disrupt the body's natural circadian rhythm. In low SES populations, irregular and long work hours may force an individual to attempt to sleep during the day. This will significantly disrupt the physiological benefits that come from sleep. Additionally, urban neighborhoods will likely have greater night noise, crime, and violence. In these neighborhoods, the body will be in a constant state of survival, releasing cortisol and adrenaline, which interfere with sleep.

Due to symptoms of low mood and energy, individuals with depression may be likely to have behaviors that are counter to good sleep hygiene, such as taking naps during the day, consuming alcohol near bedtime, and consuming large amounts of caffeine during the day. In addition to sleep hygiene education, bright light therapy can be a useful treatment for individuals with depression and circadian rhythm disturbances. Not only can morning bright light therapy help establish a better sleep-wake schedule, but it also has been shown to be effective for treating depression directly, especially when related to seasonal affective disorder.

Individuals with breathing difficulties due to asthma or allergies may experience additional barriers to quality sleep that can be addressed by specific variations of sleep hygiene recommendations. Difficulty with breathing can cause disruptions to sleep, reducing the ability to stay asleep and to achieve restful sleep. For individuals with allergies or asthma, additional considerations must be given to potential triggers in the bedroom environment. Medications that might improve ability to breathe while sleeping may also impair sleep in other ways, so there must be careful management of decongestants, asthma controllers, and antihistamines.

== Implementation ==
Sleep hygiene strategies include advice about timing of sleep and food intake in relation to exercise and the sleeping environment. Recommendations depend on knowledge of the individual situation; counselling is presented as a form of patient education.

As attention to the role of sleep hygiene in promoting public health has grown, there has been an increase in the number of resources available in print and on the internet. Organizations running public health initiatives include the National Sleep Foundation and the Division of Sleep Medicine at Harvard Medical School, both of which have created public websites with sleep hygiene resources, such as tips for sleep hygiene, instructional videos, sleep hygiene self-assessments, poll statistics on sleep hygiene, and tools to find sleep professionals. A cooperative agreement between the U.S. Centers for Disease Control and Prevention and the American Academy of Sleep Medicine was established in 2013 to coordinate the National Healthy Sleep Awareness Project, with one of their aims being to promote sleep hygiene awareness.

Long and irregular work hours contribute to the sleep health disparity in the US. Local governments could regulate business hours for those that employ high rates of low-income families. Additionally, access to care is often determined by that individual's occupation. Clinicians in the communities should advocate insurance coverage and access to care for sleep-related services. Telemedicine is a promising approach proposed to reduce barriers to sleep health care. This eliminates transportation challenges for underserved populations and is more cost-effective. Actigraphy can provide a cost-effective method to diagnose sleeping disorders. Neighborhoods can be improved by updating urban planning. Noise population can be reduced by promoting walkability among communities. Walkability is only possible when neighborhood safety is optimized.

== History ==
Some of the concepts of sleep hygiene first appeared in a book by Paolo Mantegazza published in 1864.

The term hygiene of sleep was first introduced in 1903 by Willard Moyer in his book entitled "The Witchery of Sleep", and then expanded upon in 1939 by Nathaniel Kleitman. In 1977, a book entitled "No More Sleepless Nights" by psychologist Peter Hauri introduced the concept within the context of modern sleep medicine. In this book Hauri outlined a list of behavioral rules intended to promote improved sleep. The 1990 publication of the International Classification of Sleep Disorders (ICSD) introduced the diagnostic category Inadequate Sleep Hygiene. Inadequate sleep hygiene was a subclassification of Chronic Insomnia Disorder in the ICSD-II published in 2005; it was removed from the 2014 ICSD-III along with two other classifications. The term "chronic insomnia disorder" is used for all subtypes of chronic insomnia and inadequate sleep hygiene is no longer required to diagnose any sleep disorder, including insomnia and insufficient sleep syndrome. The techniques, routines, and related products utilized for optimizing sleep sometimes use the incelosphere-related suffix "-maxx" as in sleepmaxxing on social media.

Specific sleep hygiene recommendations have changed over time. For example, advice to simply avoid sleeping pills was included in early sets of recommendations, but as more drugs to help with sleep have been introduced, recommendations concerning their use have become more complex.

== See also ==
- Chronotype
- Circadian rhythm
- Dark therapy
