= Chronotherapy (treatment scheduling) =

Use of circadian or other rhythmic cycles of a condition's symptoms in applying therapy

- MeSH: D019454

Chronotherapy, also called chronotherapeutics or chronotherapeutic drug delivery, refers to the coordination of therapeutic treatments with an individual's circadian or other rhythmic cycles. This may be done to maximize effectiveness of a specific treatment, minimize possible side effects, or both.

In the treatment of psychiatric conditions including bipolar depression, a form of chronotherapy combining intermittent sleep deprivation and morning bright light has shown efficacy and relative tolerability in a number of controlled studies.

== See also ==
- Personalized medicine
