= Dark therapy =

Use of darkness to treat psychological conditions

Dark therapy is the practice of keeping people in complete darkness for extended periods of time in an attempt to treat psychological conditions. The human body produces the melatonin hormone, which is responsible for supporting the circadian rhythms. Darkness seems to help keep these circadian rhythms stable. A related form of dark therapy is to block blue wavelength lights to stop the disintegration of melatonin.

The practice has a precursor in retreats of Tibetan monks who would descend alone into caves for 49 days, a ceremony known as yang-ti. Dark therapy was popularised in the West in the 1960s, by German anthropologist Holger Kalweit who called it Dunkeltherapie (lit. 'dark therapy').

This dark therapy concept was explored in 1998 in research which suggested that systematic exposure to darkness might alter people's mood. Original studies enforced 14 hours of darkness to bipolar patients for three nights straight. This study showed a decrease of manic episodes in the patients. Participation in this study became unrealistic, as patients did not want to participate in treatment of total darkness from 6 p.m. to 8 a.m. More recently, with the discovery of intrinsically photosensitive retinal ganglion cells, it has been hypothesized that similar results could be achieved by blocking blue light, as a potential treatment for bipolar disorder. Moreover, researchers exploring blue-blocking glasses have so far considered dark therapy only as an add-on treatment to be used together with psychotherapy, rather than a replacement for other therapies.

Another study consisting of healthy females and males suggested that a single exposure to blue light after being kept in a dim setting could reduce sleepiness. Contrary to the original claim that decreasing the amount of blue light could help with insomnia, this study suggested improvement with blue light exposure.

== See also ==
- Clinical depression
- Light therapy
- Seasonal affective disorder
- Sleep hygiene
