= Actigraphy =

Non-invasive method of monitoring human rest/activity cycles

- Purpose: monitoring human rest/activity cycles

Actigraphy is a non-invasive method of monitoring human rest/activity cycles. A small actigraph unit, also called an actimetry sensor, is worn for a week or more to measure gross motor activity. The unit is usually in a wristwatch-like package worn on the wrist. The movements the actigraph unit undergoes are continually recorded and some units also measure light exposure. The data can be later read to a computer and analysed offline; in some brands of sensors the data are transmitted and analysed in real time.

== Purpose ==
=== Sleep ===
Sleep actigraphs are generally watch-shaped and worn on the wrist of the non-dominant arm for adults and usually on the ankle for children. They are useful for determining sleep patterns and circadian rhythms and may be worn for several weeks at a time. In the medical setting, traditional polysomnography has long been cited as "the 'gold standard' for sleep assessment." Since the 1990s, however, actigraphy has increasingly been used to assess sleep/wake behavior; especially for young children. Studies have found actigraphy to be helpful for sleep research because it tends to be less expensive and cumbersome than polysomnography. Unlike polysomnography, actigraphy allows the patient to be movable and to continue her or his normal routines while the required data are being recorded in his or her natural sleep environment; this may render the measured data more generally applicable. As sleep actigraphs are more affordable than polysomnographs, their use has advantages, particularly in the case of large field studies.

However, actigraphy cannot be considered as a substitute to polysomnography. A full night sleep measured with polysomnography may be required for some sleep disorders. Indeed, actigraphy may be efficient in measuring sleep parameters and sleep quality, however it is not provided with measures for brain activity (EEG), eye movements (EOG), muscle activity (EMG) or heart rhythm (ECG).

Actigraphy is useful for assessing daytime sleepiness in place of a laboratory sleep latency test. It is used to clinically evaluate insomnia, circadian rhythm sleep disorders, excessive sleepiness. It is not recommended for the diagnosis of restless legs syndrome. It is also used in assessing the effectiveness of pharmacologic, behavioural, phototherapeutic or chronotherapeutic treatments for such disorders. The data, recorded over time, is in some cases more relevant than the result of polysomnography, particularly in assessing circadian rhythms and disorders thereof as well as insomnia.

With the actigraphy it is also possible to determine some general information related to the sleep and the sleep quality of the subject, such as his/her chronotype, the sleep onset latency, the total sleep duration, the sleep consolidation (sleep efficiency), the time spent in bed, movements, and the sleep cycle.

Research showed that both sleep and wake are not equally assessed by actigraphy devices. When compared, data collected through polysomnographs and actigraphs defines sensitivity; which is the proportion of sleep correctly detected by both methods. Actigraphy reveals itself to be more likely to detect sleep than wake phases.

Actigraphy has been actively used in sleep-related studies since the early 1990s. It has not traditionally been used in routine diagnosis of sleep disorders, but technological advances in actigraph hardware and software, as well as studies verifying data validity, have made its use increasingly common. The main reason for this development is the fact that, while retaining mobility, actigraphy offers reliable results with an accuracy that is close to those of polysomnography (above 90% for estimating total sleep time but dropping to 55% for a 4 - way sleep stage estimation problem). The technique is increasingly employed in new drug clinical trials where sleep quality is seen as a good indicator of quality of life. The technique has also been used in studies with individuals in both health and disease, e.g., Alzheimer's and fibromyalgia, conditions.

=== Activity ===
Activity actigraphs are worn and used similarly to a pedometer: around the waist, near the hip. They are useful for determining the amount of wake-time activity, and possibly estimating the number of calories burned, by the wearer. They are worn for a number of days to collect enough data for valid analysis.

=== Movement ===
Movement actigraphs are generally larger and worn on the shoulder of the dominant arm. They contain a 3D actigraph as opposed to a single dimension one, and have a high sample rate and a large memory. They are used for only a few hours, and can be used to determine problems with gait and other physical impairments.

== The actigraph unit ==
The unit itself is an integrate electronic device which generally embeds:

- an accelerometer,
- a real time clock or timer to start/stop the actigraph recording at specific times, and to record accumulate values for a specific time frame,
- a non-volatile memory to store the resulting values,
- an optional low-pass filter which filters out everything except the 2–3 Hz band, thereby ensuring external vibrations are ignored, and
- an interface, usually USB, serial, or low-power wireless, to program the timer and download the data from memory.

=== Measurements ===
Devices used for actigraphy collect data generated by movements. In order to make the data usable for practice and sleep medicine, movements are translated into digital data by actigraphs. Several devices and computer software are available, and assessment can vary depending on combination of chosen device, procedure and software program.

Actigraphs have a number of different ways of accumulating the values from the accelerometer in memory. ZCM (zero crossing mode) counts the number of times the accelerometer waveform crosses 0 for each time period. PIM (proportional integral mode) measures the area under the curve, and adds that size for each time period. TAT (time above threshold) uses a certain threshold, and measures the length of time that the wave is above a certain threshold. Literature shows that PIM provides most accurate measurements for both sleep and activity, though the difference with ZCM is marginal.

=== Features ===
Actigraph units vary widely in size and features and can be expanded to include additional measurements. However, there are a number of limiting factors:

- Fastest sample rate: 1-minute intervals provide adequate detail to measure sleep, but could be too slow for measuring other parameters.
- Amount of memory: Together with sample rate, the amount of memory determines how long measurements can be taken.
- Battery usage: Some actigraphs have a short battery life.
- Weight: the heavier the actigraph, the more disruptive its use.
- Water resistance: for proper measurements it is often desirable that the actigraph be worn in the shower, bathtub, or even while swimming/diving.

For some uses, the following are examples of additional features:

- Watch functionality: making the device more attractive to the user.
- User input: most actigraphs now include a button so the user can indicate a specific event that occurs, for example lights out at bedtime.
- Subjective user input: for example a query function to allow surveys at specific times.
- Sensors which monitor:
  - temperature
  - ambient light
  - sound levels
  - Parkinsonian tremor
  - skin resistance
  - a full EEG data stream

=== Advantages ===
One advantage of actigraphy methods over polysomnography methods is about duration. Recording is longer than laboratory settings, duration of collection of data may be adapted to each patient and highlight information that cannot be found through one-night measurements such as sleep habits. Actigraphy also captures daytime activity, which is not captured by polysomnography. Actigraphy turns out to be especially adapted to pediatric and elderly patients.

=== Disadvantages ===
The actigraph is recorded at home, and therefore a high compliance is needed: patients need to complete a sleep diary and always wear the watch. Sometimes, the actigraph doesn't properly record sleep; for example, a nap during a car ride isn't always logged as sleep. In contrast, showers close to the sleep period can be erroneously recorded as sleep. These false positives are relatively common: while actigraphy is good at detecting sleep patterns (sensitivity: 0.965), it has its difficulties in detecting wake periods (specificity: 0.329). As an electronic device, there can be unobserved technical malfunctions that detrimentally affect actigraphic measurement.

== Consumer electronics devices ==
Some consumer electronics devices, such as the Oura Ring and the Huawei Honor Band, employ actigraphy to estimate sleep patterns. Other devices, such as the Fitbit Alta HR, have been found to provide equivalent estimates across all traditional sleep parameters, compared to more traditional actigraph units.
