= Sleep diary =

Method of recording sleep patterns

Example layout of a sleep diary

A sleep diary is a record of an individual's sleeping and waking times with related information, usually over a period of several weeks. It is self-reported or can be recorded by a caregiver.

The sleep diary, or sleep log, is a tool used by doctors and patients. It is a useful resource in the diagnosis and treatment of especially circadian rhythm sleep disorders, and in monitoring whether treatment of those and other sleep disorders is successful.

Sleep diaries may be used in conjunction with actigraphy.

In addition to being a useful tool for medical professionals in the diagnosis of sleep problems, a sleep diary can help make individuals more aware of the parameters affecting their sleep. This data alone can help people self-diagnose what helps them get a good sleep.

== Components ==
The information contained in a sleep diary includes some or all of the following points:

1. The time the person had wanted or intended to wake up
2. The time the person woke up
3. Whether the person woke up spontaneously, by an alarm clock, or because of another (specified) disturbance
4. The time the person got out of bed
5. A few words about how the person felt during the day (mood, drowsiness, etc.), often on a scale from 1 to 5 and the major cause
6. The start and end times of any daytime naps and exercises
7. The name, dosage and time of any drugs used including medication, sleep aids, caffeine and alcohol
8. The time and type/heaviness of evening meal
9. Activities the last hour before bedtime, such as meditation, watching TV, playing PC-games
10. Stress level before bedtime, often on a scale from 1 to 5 and the major cause
11. The time the person tried to fall asleep
12. The time the person thinks sleep onset occurred
13. Activity during aforementioned two moments (remaining eyes closed, meditating, etc.)
14. The presumed cause, number, time, and length of any nighttime awakenings and activities during these moments
15. Quality of sleep
16. Level of comfort of any recalled good or bad dreams

== Data collection ==
Sleep logs are often hand-drawn on graph paper, as a rule one week per page. Specialized software for creating sleep logs is also available; a spreadsheet or database software can also be used. Online services can also be used to track daily sleep patterns.

== As an assessment and intervention tool ==
Sleep diaries are a key component of the assessment and treatment of Insomnia II. They make it possible to quantify the severity of a sleep disorder, are a helpful addition for a correct diagnosis and guide the intervention by tracking the changes in sleep. They also make it possible to measure the treatment outcomes in a reliable fashion. Further, they can provide insight as to how well the patient is adhering to a prescribed sleep schedule. The advantages of sleep diaries over other measurements is their simple and inexpensive nature. They are easy to use, provide crucial information and can also be online based. The disadvantages of sleep diaries are that inaccurate or incomplete data is provided by the patient, scoring time used by the clinician and scoring errors on the clinician's side (only paper version).

== See also ==
- Dream diary
