= Idiopathic hypersomnia =

Sleep disorder of unknown cause

- Specialty: Sleep medicine, Neurology, Psychiatry
- Symptoms: Difficulty staying awake, mental fog, persistent sleepiness
- Usual onset: Adolescence
- Duration: Chronic
- Medication: Stimulants (modafinil, methylphenidate, amphetamine, solriamfetol, pitolisant), sodium oxybate, mixed oxybate salts

Idiopathic hypersomnia (IH) is a neurological disorder which is characterized primarily by excessive sleep and excessive daytime sleepiness (EDS). Idiopathic hypersomnia was first described by Bedrich Roth in 1956, and it can be divided into two forms: polysymptomatic and monosymptomatic. The condition typically becomes evident in early adulthood and most patients diagnosed with IH will have had the disorder for many years prior to their diagnosis. As of August 2021, an FDA-approved medication exists for IH called Xywav, which is an oral solution of calcium, magnesium, potassium, and sodium oxybates; in addition to several off-label treatments (primarily FDA-approved narcolepsy medications).

Idiopathic hypersomnia may also be referred to as IH, IHS, or primary hypersomnia, and belongs to a group of sleep disorders known as central hypersomnias, central disorders of hypersomnolence, or hypersomnia of brain origin. Diagnostic and Statistical Manual of Mental Disorders, Fourth Edition (DSM-IV) defines idiopathic hypersomnia as EDS without narcolepsy or the associated features of other sleep disorders. It occurs in the absence of medical problems or sleep disruptions, such as sleep apnea, that can cause secondary hypersomnia. It is relatively common for mood disorders (depression or bipolar disorder) to occur at the same time as IH, with a small increase in anxiety disorder diagnoses.

== Signs and symptoms ==
Individuals with IH share common symptoms including excessive daytime sleepiness, sleep inertia, brain fog, and long sleep periods.

- Excessive daytime sleepiness, characterized by persistent sleepiness throughout the day and often a general lack of energy, even during the day after apparently adequate or even prolonged nighttime sleep. People with EDS nap repeatedly throughout the day and have strong urges to sleep while driving, working, eating, or conversing with others.
- Sleep inertia (also known as sleep drunkenness), characterized by having extreme difficulty waking up and feeling an uncontrollable desire to go back to sleep.
- Clouding of consciousness characterized by inattention, thought process abnormalities, comprehension abnormalities, and language abnormalities. These symptoms may affect performance on perception, memory, learning, executive functions, language, constructive abilities, voluntary motor control, attention, and mental speed. Affected individuals can complain of forgetfulness, confusion, or inability to think clearly.
- Excessive sleep (9 hours or more over a full 24-hour period), without feeling refreshed after waking. Daytime naps can be up to several hours and are also unrefreshing.

Some studies have shown increased frequencies of palpitations, digestive problems, difficulty with body temperature regulation, and other symptoms in patients with IH. Anxiety and depression are frequent, and are likely to be a response to chronic illness. A case series in 2010 found that peripheral vascular symptoms, such as cold hands and feet (e.g., Raynaud syndrome), were more common in people with IH than in controls.

Other autonomic dysfunctional symptoms, such as fainting episodes, dizziness upon arising, possibly migrainous headaches, food cravings, and impotence may also be correlated with IH. Researchers have found that people reporting IH symptoms report high levels of autonomic dysfunction on par with other conditions of autonomic failure (i.e., MSA and diabetes). As of 2019 there is no evidence that such symptoms are related to IH.

== Causes ==
Unlike narcolepsy with cataplexy, which has a known cause (autoimmune destruction of hypocretin-producing neurons), the cause of IH is largely unknown. As of 2012, researchers have identified a few abnormalities associated with IH, which with further study may help to clarify the etiology.

Destruction of noradrenergic neurons has produced hypersomnia in experimental animal studies, and injury to adrenergic neurons has also been shown to lead to hypersomnia. IH has also been associated with a malfunction of the norepinephrine system and decreased cerebrospinal fluid (CSF) histamine levels.

Researchers have recently found an abnormal hypersensitivity to GABA (the major brain chemical responsible for sedation) in a subset of patients with central hypersomnia i.e.: IH, narcolepsy without cataplexy and long sleepers. They have identified a small (500 to 3000 daltons) naturally occurring bioactive substance (most likely a peptide as it is trypsin-sensitive) in the CSF of affected patients. Although this substance requires further identification of its chemical structure, it is currently referred to as a "somnogen" because it has been shown to cause hyper-reactivity of GABA_{A} receptors, which leads to increased sedation or somnolence. In essence, it is as though these patients are chronically sedated with a benzodiazepine (medication which acts through the GABA system) such as midazolam or alprazolam, even though they do not take these medications.

== Diagnosis ==
Idiopathic hypersomnia lacks a clearly defining biological marker (e.g., HLA-DQB1*0602 genotype in narcolepsy). Doctors can more carefully exclude these causes of EDS in order to more correctly diagnose IH. However, "even in the presence of other specific causes of hypersomnia, one should carefully assess the contribution of these etiological factors to the complaint of EDS and when specific treatments of these conditions fail to suppress EDS, the additional diagnosis of IH should be considered." IH remains underrecognized and frequently misdiagnosed.

The severity of EDS can be quantified by subjective scales, such as the Epworth Sleepiness Scale and the Stanford Sleepiness Scale, and also by objective tests, like actigraphy, psychomotor vigilance task, maintenance of wakefulness test (MWT), multiple sleep latency test (MSLT) although as per latest research studies, the effectiveness of MSLT has been called into question. Several groups of researchers have found normal MSLT results in patients who otherwise seem to have IH. Therefore, when IH is suspected, researchers suggest appending a 24-hour continuous polysomnography to the standard overnight/MSLT study in order to record total sleep time.

The recent studies have also found that reports of sleepiness in IH relate more to mental fatigue rather than physiological sleepiness per se and the subjective scales like ESS, IH symptom diary (IHSD) and PGIC better captures the severity of symptoms consistently.

It is also important to note that whereas narcolepsy is strongly associated with the HLA-DQB1*0602 genotype, "HLA typing is of no help in the positive diagnosis of idiopathic hypersomnia." This is "despite some reports that suggest an increase [sic] frequency of HLA Cw2 and DRS in idiopathic hypersomnia subjects."

In patients with IH, polysomnography typically shows short sleep latency, increased mean slow wave sleep, and a high mean sleep efficiency. "Latency to REM sleep and percentages of light sleep and REM sleep were normal, compared with normal ranges." Despite this, one study has found increased sleep fragmentation in patients with IH without long sleep time, suggesting multiple possible presentations.

Per ICSD-3, five criteria must be met for a diagnosis of IH:

1. Daytime lapses into sleep or an irrepressible need to sleep on a daily basis, for at least 3 months
2. Absence of insufficient sleep syndrome
3. Absence of cataplexy
4. Absence of other causes of hypersomnia
5. The presence of positive MSLT tests.

The latest ICD-10 defines IH with long sleep time as a neurological disorder that is a rare sleep disorder characterized by prolonged sleep at night and extreme sleepiness during the day. There are no apparent causes. This disorder affects the ability to function. It is of central nervous system origin characterized by prolonged nocturnal sleep and periods of daytime drowsiness. Affected individuals experience difficulty with awakening in the morning and may have associated sleep drunkenness, automatic behaviors, and memory disturbances. This condition differs from narcolepsy in that daytime sleep periods are longer, there is no association with cataplexy, and the multiple sleep latency onset test does not record sleep-onset rapid eye movement sleep.

== Management ==
Since the underlying mechanism is not yet fully understood, treatment efforts have usually focused on symptom management. In August 2021, low-sodium oxybate (Xywav) became the first U.S. FDA-approved treatment for idiopathic hypersomnia. Wake-promoting medications used in narcolepsy are also commonly used off-label to help manage the excessive daytime sleepiness of IH. Stimulants tend to be less effective for IH than they are for narcolepsy and may be less well tolerated.

=== Stimulants ===
The main treatment of excessive daytime sleepiness is done through central nervous system stimulants. However, no stimulant medication has received FDA or EMA approval for the treatment of EDS in IH. As such, stimulants are used off-label in the treatment of IH.

Modafinil and armodafinil are non-amphetamine wake-promoting agents often used in the treatment of IH. They are thought to work by binding to the dopamine transporter, thereby inhibiting dopamine reuptake and increasing its availability. Modafinil can cause uncomfortable side effects, including nausea, headache, and a dry mouth for some patients, while other patients report no noticeable improvement even on relatively high dosages. They may also "interact with low-dose contraceptives, potentially reducing efficacy, although the scientific data supporting this claim is weak and rests on poorly documented anecdotes."

Methylphenidate and dextroamphetamine are psychostimulants with long histories of use in the treatment of hypersomnolence. Increased extracellular dopamine availability is thought to be the main property explaining wake-promotion from these medications, although effects on norepinephrine also likely contribute. Insomnia is another common side effect and may require additional treatment.

Solriamfetol is a dopamine and norepinephrine reuptake inhibitor (NDRI) used to treat excessive daytime sleepiness associated with narcolepsy and obstructive sleep apnea.

Pitolisant, a selective histamine 3 (H3) receptor antagonist/inverse agonist. It works by increasing the synthesis and release of histamine, a wake-promoting neurotransmitter in the brain.

=== Sleep-promoting medications ===
Sodium oxybate (Xyrem) is an orphan drug which was designed specifically for the treatment of narcolepsy. Common side effects include nausea, dizziness, and hallucinations. A 2016 study by Leu-Semenescu et al. found sodium oxybate reduced daytime sleepiness in IH to the same degree as in patients with narcolepsy type 1, and the drug improved severe sleep inertia in 71% of the hypersomnia patients. In July 2020, the FDA approved Xywav (calcium, magnesium, potassium, and sodium oxybates), an oral solution for the treatment of cataplexy or excessive daytime sleepiness (EDS) in patients 7 years of age and older with narcolepsy.

=== Cognitive behavioral therapy ===
Although behavioral approaches have not been demonstrated to improve clinical markers of IH, cognitive behavioral therapy (CBT) has been found to potentially reduce depressive symptoms and improve self-efficacy in people with hypersomnia.

== Prognosis ==
IH can profoundly affect work, education, and quality of life due to excessive daytime somnolence. Patients will often need to adapt their lifestyle to avoid situations that might be dangerous while sleepy, such as high risk work, or driving. The risks associated with these activities have been found to be higher for patients with hypersomnias than for those with sleep apnea or severe insomnia.

== Epidemiology ==
Typically, the symptoms of IH begin in adolescence or young adulthood, although they can begin at a later age. After onset, hypersomnia often worsens over several years, but it is often stable by the time of diagnosis and appears to be a lifelong condition. Spontaneous remission is only seen in 10–15% of patients.

According to the limited epidemiological data that exists, IH "has more of a female preponderance (1.8/1)." Family cases are frequent, in a range from 25% to 66% without any clear mode of inheritance."

IH has long been considered a rare disease, believed to be 10 times less frequent than narcolepsy. The prevalence of narcolepsy (with cataplexy) is estimated between 1/3,300 and 1/5,000. Although the true prevalence of IH is unknown, it is estimated at 1/10,000 to 1/25,000 for the long sleep form and 1/11,000 to 1/100,000 without long sleep. A more precise estimate "is complicated by a lack of clear biologic markers" and a lack of "unambiguous diagnostic criteria."

Because of the rarity of IH, research into the condition is limited "Patients are rare, researchers and scientists involved in the field are few and research findings are therefore scarce." "In Europe and in North America there is now a public health concern about helping patients and families affected by these rare diseases. Due to the complexity of the disease, they often experience difficulties to be diagnosed and often face social and professional consequences."

== Research ==
=== GABA-directed medications ===
There is ongoing research into the efficacy of gamma aminobutyric acid A (GABA_{A}) receptor antagonists for the treatment of IH. Research findings suggest that the GABA neurotransmitter system plays a significant role in the etiology of primary hypersomnias, such as IH and Narcolepsy Type 2. Given the possible role of hyperactive GABA_{A} receptors in IH, medications that could counteract this activity are being studied to test their potential to improve sleepiness. These currently include clarithromycin and flumazenil.

Flumazenil, a GABA_{A} receptor antagonist is approved by the FDA for use in anesthesia reversal and benzodiazepine overdose. Research has shown that flumazenil provides relief for most patients whose CSF contains the unknown "somnogen" that enhances the function of GABA_{A} receptors, making them more susceptible to the sleep-inducing effect of GABA. For one patient, daily administration of flumazenil by sublingual lozenge and topical cream has proven effective for several years. A 2014 case report also showed improvement in IH symptoms after treatment with a continuous subcutaneous flumazenil administration. The patient was treated with a short-term subcutaneous administration through 96-hour continuous low dose (4 mg/day) infusion of flumazenil, followed by a slow-release long term subcutaneous administration through flumazenil implant.

Clarithromycin, an antibiotic approved by the FDA for the treatment of infections, was found to return the function of the GABA system to normal in patients with IH. In the pilot study, clarithromycin improved subjective sleepiness in GABA-related hypersomnia. In 2013, a retrospective review evaluating longer-term clarithromycin use showed efficacy in a large percentage of patients with GABA-related hypersomnia. A 2021 Cochrane study determined that the evidence is inadequate to definitively determine the efficacy of clarithromycin in the management of idiopathic hypersomnia. The American Academy of Sleep Medicine's 2021 clinical practice guidelines conditionally suggested its use, especially for those who don't respond to other therapies.

=== Transcranial direct-current stimulation (tDCS) ===
Dr. Ferini-Strambi and his colleagues in Milan, Italy, performed neurologic examinations by applying anodal tDCS by placing one electrode over the left dorsolateral prefrontal cortex, with the cathode over the contralateral orbit over 3 weeks period and found that seven of the eight participants (87.5%) reported improvement in their daytime sleepiness, including for up to two weeks after the end of the study.

=== Transcranial magnetic stimulation (TMS) ===
Neural networks that regulate arousal and sleep comprise a bottom-up (from the brainstem to the cortex) pathway and a top-down (corticothalamic) pathway. The bottom-up pathway emerges from the ascending reticular arousal system (ARAS) and activates the cortex via well-characterized thalamic and nonthalamic pathways through cholinergic and aminergic neurotransmission. The bottom-up pathway represents the leverage point for pharmaceutical interventions. It is complemented by a corticothalamic top-down pathway, which appears to be modifiable through noninvasive brain stimulation (NIBS) techniques. A single case report study indicates that high-frequency repetitive transcranial magnetic stimulation (HF rTMS) over the left dorsolateral prefrontal cortex (DLPFC) might represent an alternative choice for symptom control in narcoleptic patients with cataplexy. rTMS may also exert intrinsic effects on hypersomnia in depressed adolescents.

=== Mazindol ===
Mazindol is a stimulant similar to amphetamine that "has been shown to be effective in treating hypersomnia in narcoleptics." However, it is not currently approved in the US.

=== Selegiline ===
Selegiline, a monoamine oxidase B (MAO-B) inhibitor, works by slowing the breakdown of certain substances in the brain (mostly dopamine, but also serotonin and norepinephrine). It may also be useful, as it is also a metabolic precursor of amphetamine and exerts most of its therapeutic effects through amphetamine metabolism. It is not commonly prescribed for people with narcolepsy because of the high dosage required and potential for severe side effects.

=== Atomoxetine ===
Atomoxetine is a norepinephrine reuptake inhibitor (NRI) which increases wakefulness (generally less strongly than the medications which act on dopamine) and which has been argued to have a "clear use in the therapeutic arsenal against narcolepsy and hypersomnia although undocumented by clinical trials."

=== Ritanserin ===
Ritanserin is a serotonin antagonist that has "been shown to improve daytime alertness and subjective sleep quality in patients on their usual narcolepsy medications." It is intended as an adjunct (supplement to another main therapeutic agent), and although it is not available in the US, it is available in Europe.

=== Antidepressants ===
Antidepressants seems to have some therapeutic effects as they enhance synaptic levels of norepinephrine and serotonin. Further, different medicines are known to augment the activity of one another like as seen in the case of fluoxetine which augmented the activity of methylphenidate when taken together.

Bupropion, a norepinephrine-dopamine reuptake inhibitor (NDRI), which works by inhibiting the reabsorption of two important brain chemicals – norepinephrine and dopamine, is known to have wake-promoting effects.

Fluoxetine, an antidepressant of the selective serotonin reuptake inhibitor (SSRI) class is also known to have mild stimulating effects. It is also known to augment the activity of methylphenidate.

=== Caffeine ===
Caffeine is one of the safer nondopaminergic wake-promoting compounds. It is widely used but "has intolerable side effects at high doses (including cardiovascular), and it is generally not efficient enough for patients with hypersomnia or narcolepsy." Although it is commonly used by people with IH or narcolepsy, many people with these disorders report that it has only limited benefit on their sleepiness.

=== Melatonin ===
Melatonin is a hormone that the body produces to help regulate sleep. One small study, which used a dose of 2 mg slow-release melatonin at bedtime, found that 50% of participants had "shortened nocturnal sleep duration, decreased sleep inertia, and relieved daytime sleepiness." Other studies have shown that melatonin synchronizes the circadian rhythms, and improves the "onset, duration and quality of sleep."

=== Levothyroxine ===
There have been some studies suggesting levothyroxine as a possible treatment for IH, especially for patients with subclinical hypothyroidism. This treatment does carry potential risks (especially for patients without hypothyroidism or subclinical hypothroidism), which include cardiac arrhythmia.

=== Orexin agonists ===
Orexin-A has been shown to be strongly wake-promoting in animal models, but it does not cross the blood–brain barrier. Suvorexant, a orexin receptor antagonist, has been developed to limit the natural effects of orexin in patients with insomnia. It is therefore possible that a orexin agonist may be similarly developed for the treatment of hypersomnia.

=== Levodopa ===
Levodopa (L-DOPA) is an amino acid and is the precursor to the neurotransmitters dopamine, norepinephrine (noradrenaline), and epinephrine (adrenaline). As per a study of six narcoleptic patients it was found that L-DOPA improved vigilance and performance as evaluated by the AVS and the FCRTT, while the capacity to fall asleep rapidly remained unchanged as evaluated by the MSLT. It raises the hypothesis that dopamine may play a role in the physiopathology of excessive daytime sleepiness of this condition.

=== Carnitine ===
Carnitine has also been shown to improve narcolepsy symptoms (including daytime sleepiness) by increasing fatty-acid oxidation. Abnormally low levels of acylcarnitine have been observed in patients with narcolepsy. These same low levels have been associated with primary hypersomnia in general in mouse studies. "Mice with systemic carnitine deficiency exhibit a higher frequency of fragmented wakefulness and rapid eye movement (REM) sleep, and reduced locomotor activity." Administration of acetyl-L-carnitine was shown to improve these symptoms in mice. A subsequent human trial found that narcolepsy patients given L-carnitine spent less total time in daytime sleep than patients who were given placebo.

== See also ==
- Altered level of consciousness – Measure of arousal other than normal
- Ascending reticular activating system – Spinal trigeminal nucleus
- Circadian rhythm – Natural internal process that regulates the sleep-wake cycle
- Doping in sport – Use of banned drugs by athletes
- List of drugs banned by WADA
- List of investigational narcolepsy and hypersomnia drugs – Investigational narcolepsy and hypersomnia drugs
- Neuroscience of sleep – Physiological nature of sleep
- Nootropic – Compound intended to improve cognitive function
- Sleep – Naturally recurring resting state of mind and body
- Sleep medicine – Medical specialty
- Sleep hygiene – Set of practices around healthy sleeping
- Sleep study – Medical recording of sleep activity
- Somnology – Scientific study of sleep
- Stimulant – Drug that increases alertness
- Wakefulness – Brain state and state of consciousness
