= Michael L. Perlis =

American sleep researcher

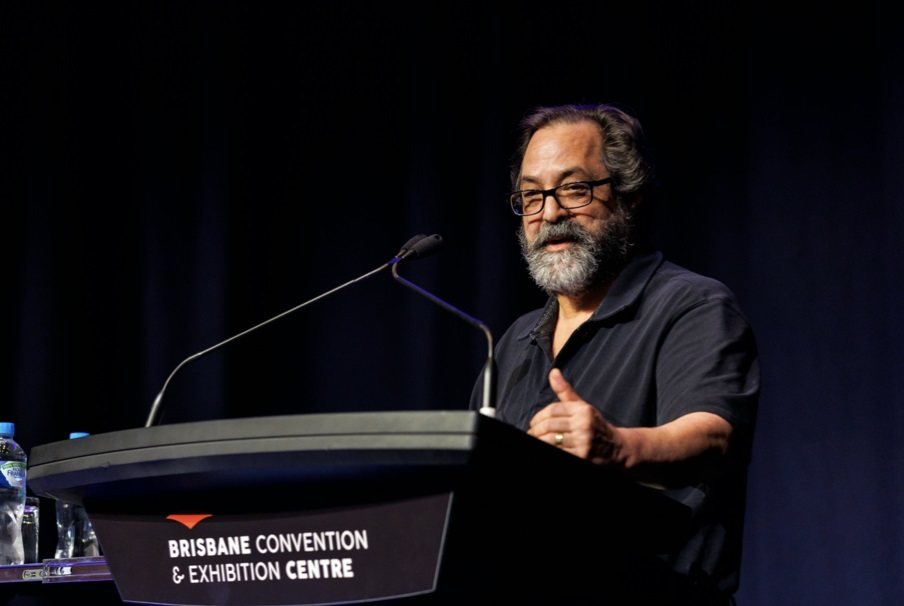

Michael L. Perlis is an American clinical research scientist in insomnia and behavioral sleep medicine. He is Director of the Behavioral Sleep Medicine Program at the University of Pennsylvania, where he is also an associate professor of Psychiatry and Nursing.

Perlis has worked in the fields of behavioral sleep medicine and sleep research since 1984.

== Education ==
Perlis received his bachelor's degree in religious studies from Guilford College, and his master's degree in Psychology and PhD in Clinical Psychology from the University of Arizona.

== Career ==
Perlis is Director of the Behavioral Sleep Medicine Program at the University of Pennsylvania, where he is also an associate professor of Psychiatry and Nursing. He also serves on the Journal of Sleep Research, The Journal of Sleep Medicine Research, the journal of Behavioral Sleep Medicine, and the Journal of Health Psychology.

Perlis received The Peter Hauri Career Distinguished Achievement Award from the Society of Behavioral Sleep Medicine, and served as a founding and organizing member of the Society of Behavioral Sleep Medicine.

=== Research ===
Perlis has published over 200 peer-reviewed scientific articles on the etiology of and treatments for Chronic Insomnia. His contributions to the literature include establishing sleep disturbance as a causal factor in depression, establishing the antidepressant effects of Cognitive Behavioral Therapy for Insomnia, and evaluating the comparative efficacy of medication treatment and behavioral treatments for Insomnia.

Perlis is a co-author of the first textbook on Cognitive Behavioral Therapy for Insomnia, and has conducted training workshops on CBT-I for clinicians.
