= Xywav =

Combination drug

Combination of
- Calcium oxybate: Central nervous system depressant
- Magnesium oxybate: Central nervous system depressant
- Potassium oxybate: Central nervous system depressant
- Sodium oxybate: Central nervous system depressant

Clinical data
- Trade names: Xywav
- Other names: JZP-258
- AHFS/Drugs.com: Micromedex Detailed Consumer Information
- MedlinePlus: a621001
- License data: US DailyMed: Calcium magnesium potassium and sodium oxybates
- Routes of administration: By mouth
- ATC code: None

Legal status
- Legal status: US: Schedule III

Identifiers
- KEGG: D12131

Xywav (calcium oxybate/magnesium oxybate/potassium oxybate/sodium oxybate) is a fixed-dose combination medication used to treat cataplexy or excessive daytime sleepiness. It contains a mixture of the oxybate salts calcium oxybate, magnesium oxybate, potassium oxybate, and sodium oxybate. It is a central nervous system (CNS) depressant and it is taken by mouth.

It is manufactured by Jazz Pharmaceuticals and was approved for medical use in the United States in July 2020.

== Medical uses ==
Xywav is indicated for the treatment of cataplexy or excessive daytime sleepiness in people aged seven years of age and older with narcolepsy; and for idiopathic hypersomnia.

Xywav is recommended to be dosed twice nightly in narcolepsy and idiopathic hypersomnia (≤9g total), with an additional option for once nightly dosing in idiopathic hypersomnia (≤6g).

== Research ==
In September 2025, Jazz Pharmaceuticals presented data from an open-label study evaluating higher doses of Xywav in narcoleptic patients; the analysis reported that doses of 9-12 g nightly were associated with additional improvements in excessive daytime sleepiness and cataplexy frequency compared with the currently approved maximum dose of ≤9 g.

== Chemical composition ==
Xywav is composed of 46.8% calcium, 26% potassium, 19.2% magnesium, and 8% sodium oxybate by weight in an oral solution. The concentration of oxybate salts in solution is 0.5 g/ml, equivalent to .413 grams of total oxybate.

== Side effects ==
The US Food and Drug Administration label for Xywav contains a boxed warning for central nervous system depression, abuse, and misuse.

=== Respiratory ===
Slowed breathing, trouble breathing, sleep apnea.

=== Psychiatric ===
Confusion, hallucination, unusual or disturbing thoughts (abnormal thinking), anxiety, depression, suicidal thoughts or actions, increased tiredness, feelings of guilt or worthlessness, and difficulty concentrating.

=== Other ===
Sleepwalking.

== Society and culture ==
=== Legal status ===
Xywav was granted orphan drug designation by the US Food and Drug Administration.

Xywav is a prescription drug and a Schedule III controlled substance in the United States.

=== Other names ===
In the testing phase of the drug, it was known as JZP-258.

Calcium, magnesium, potassium, and sodium oxybate are salts of gamma hydroxybutyrate (GHB).
