= Sleep state misperception =

- Other names: Paradoxical insomnia, pseudo-insomnia, subjective insomnia, subjective sleepiness, sleep hypochondriasis
- Specialty: Sleep medicine

Sleep state misperception (SSM) is a term in the International Classification of Sleep Disorders (ICSD) most commonly used for people who mistakenly perceive their sleep as wakefulness, though it has been proposed that it can be applied to those who severely overestimate their sleep time as well ("positive" sleep state misperception). While most sleepers with this condition will report not having slept in the previous night at all or having slept very little, clinical recordings generally show normal sleep patterns. Though the sleep patterns found in those with SSM have long been considered indistinguishable from those without, some preliminary research suggest there may be subtle differences (see Symptoms and diagnosis: Spectral analysis).

Patients are otherwise generally in good health, and any illnesses—such as depression—appear to be more associated with fear of negative consequences of insomnia ("insomnia phobia") than from any actual loss of sleep.

Sleep state misperception was adopted by the ICSD to replace two previous diagnostic terminologies: "subjective insomnia complaint without objective findings" and "subjective sleepiness complaint without objective findings."

The validity and reliability of sleep state misperception as a pertinent diagnosis has been questioned, with studies finding poor empirical support.

== Classification ==
Sleep state misperception is classified as an intrinsic dyssomnia. While SSM is regarded a sub-type of insomnia, it is also established as a separate sleep-condition, with distinct pathophysiology. Nonetheless, the value of distinguishing this type of insomnia from other types is debatable due to the relatively low frequency of SSM being reported.

Sleep state misperception can also be further broken down into several types, by patients who:

- report short sleep (subjective insomnia complaint without objective findings)
  - or no sleep at all (subjective total insomnia)
- report excessive daytime sleepiness (subjective sleepiness complaint without objective findings)
- report sleeping too much (subjective hypersomnia without objective findings)

== Validity ==
The validity and reliability of the sleep state misperception as a pertinent medical entity was questioned. A study found poor empirical support for this diagnostic item.

== Symptoms and diagnosis ==
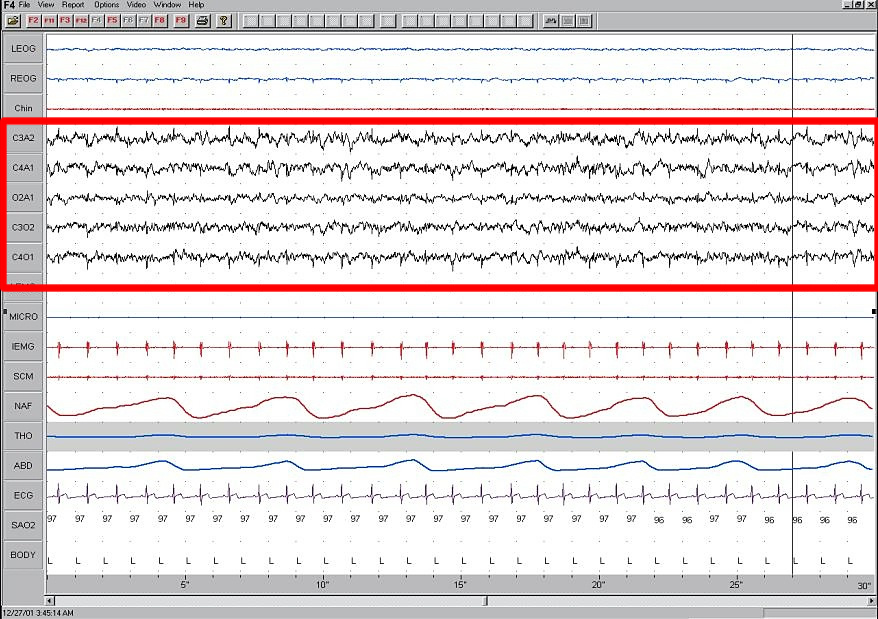
Sleep waves (EEG highlighted above) recorded from those with SSM may appear indistinguishable from those without.

This sleep disorder frequently applies when patients report not feeling tired despite their subjective perception of not having slept. Generally, they may describe experiencing several years of no sleep, short sleep, or non-restorative sleep. Otherwise, patients appear healthy, both psychiatrically and medically. (That this condition is often asymptomatic could explain why it is relatively unreported.)

However, upon clinical observation, it is found that patients may severely overestimate the time they took to fall asleep—often reporting having slept half the amount of time indicated by polysomnogram or electroencephalography (EEG), which may record normal sleep. Observing such discrepancy between subjective and objective reports, clinicians may conclude that the perception of poor sleep is primarily illusionary.

Alternatively, some people may report excessive daytime sleepiness or chronic disabling sleepiness, while no sleep disorder has been found to exist. Methods of diagnosing sleepiness objectively, such as the Multiple Sleep Latency Test, do not confirm the symptom—objective sleepiness is not observed despite the complaint.

Finally, on the opposite end of the spectrum, other patients may report feeling that they have slept much longer than is observed. It has been proposed that this experience be subclassified under sleep state misperception as "positive sleep state misperception", "reverse sleep state misperception", and "negative sleep state misperception".

=== Diagnostic criteria ===
The patient has a complaint of insomnia while sleep quality and duration are normal. Polysomnographic monitoring demonstrates normal sleep latency, a normal number of arousals and awakenings, and normal sleep duration with or without a multiple sleep latency test that demonstrates a mean sleep latency of greater than 10 minutes. No medical or mental disorder produces the complaint. Other sleep disorders producing insomnia are not present to a degree that would explain the patient's complaint.

=== Detection and difficulties ===
Detecting sleep state misperception by objective means has been elusive.

A 2011 study published in the journal Psychosomatic Medicine has shown that sleep misperception (i.e., underestimation of sleep duration) is prevalent among chronic insomniacs who sleep objectively more than 6 hours in the sleep lab. The psychological profile of these chronic insomniacs with objective normal sleep duration is characterized by depressive, anxious-ruminative traits and poor coping resources. Thus, it appears that not all chronic insomniacs underestimate their sleep duration, and that sleep misperception is a clinical characteristic of chronic insomniacs with objective normal sleep duration. Furthermore, rumination and poor coping resources may play a significant role in sleep misperception.

=== Spectral analysis ===
According to a May 2014 article published in New Scientist, spectral analysis may help clinicians find objective evidence for sleep state misperception:

[...] it uncovered [...] subtle differences in the EEGs of sleeping insomniacs: alpha waves – signatures of wakefulness that are supposed to show up only in early sleep – were intruding into deep sleep. [...] [psychologist and sleep researcher Michael] Perlis. But Andrew Krystal of Duke University in Durham, North Carolina, used spectral analysis to quantify just how much they were intruding. Krystal's non-sleepers not only had a greater proportion of these alpha disturbances, but the alpha waves were bigger and the delta waves were correspondingly smaller. That wasn't all. When Perlis and other researchers applied spectral analysis algorithms to the EEGs of their sleeping insomniacs, they found different patterns, fast waves known as beta and gamma (Sleep, vol 24, p 110). Normally, these are indicators of consciousness, alertness and even anxiety [...] Like alpha waves, Perlis calls these beta and gamma waves "intrusions" into normal sleep: "It's as if somebody is playing with the switch – boop, boop – flipping at a mad rate between wake and sleep".

=== Distinction from insomnia ===
What is considered objective insomnia, unlike SSM, can easily be confirmed empirically through clinical testing, such as by polysomnogram. Those who experience SSM may believe that they have not slept for extended periods of time, when they in fact do sleep but without perceiving it. For example, while patients who claim little or no sleep may usually acknowledge impaired job performance and daytime drowsiness, sleep state misperceivers often do not.

Cases of objective total insomnia are extremely rare. The few that have been recorded have predominantly been ascribed to a rare incurable genetic disorder called fatal familial insomnia, which patients rarely survive for more than 26 months after the onset of illness—often much less.

== Treatment ==
Behavioral treatment can be effective in some cases. Sedative hypnotics may also help relieve the symptoms. Additionally, education about normal patterns of the sleep-wake cycle may alleviate anxiety in some patients. For patients with severe depression resulting from the fear of having insomnia, electroconvulsive therapy appears to be a safe and effective treatment.

=== Complications ===
A subject who is not being monitored (by a recording or other observer) may not have a way to tell if a treatment is working properly due to the amnesic nature of SSM.

The condition may worsen as a result of persistent attempts to treat the symptoms through conventional methods of dealing with insomnia. The prescription of hypnotics or stimulants may lead to drug dependency as a complication.

Nonetheless, chronic SSM may increase risk for depression, anxiety, and substance abuse. It has also been noted that patients with this condition may sometimes opt to take medications over other treatments "for the wrong reasons (e.g. because of euphoriant properties)."

== Epidemiology ==
SSM is poorly understood. As of 2008, there is little to no information regarding risk factors or prevention, though it is believed to be most prevalent among young to middle aged adults.

Distribution among the general population and by gender is unknown. About 5% of the clinical population may be affected, though that figure is subject to sampling bias.

== See also ==
- Second wind (sleep)
- Somniphobia
