= ERRT =

ERRT may refer to:

- European Retail Round Table, a European organization that represented companies from the European retail sector until 2019
- Exposure, relaxation, and rescripting therapy for nightmare disorder, in behavioral sleep medicine
- Error rate with respect to truncation, a linguistic evaluation method developed by Christopher D. Paice
