= Behavioral sleep medicine =

Medical specialty

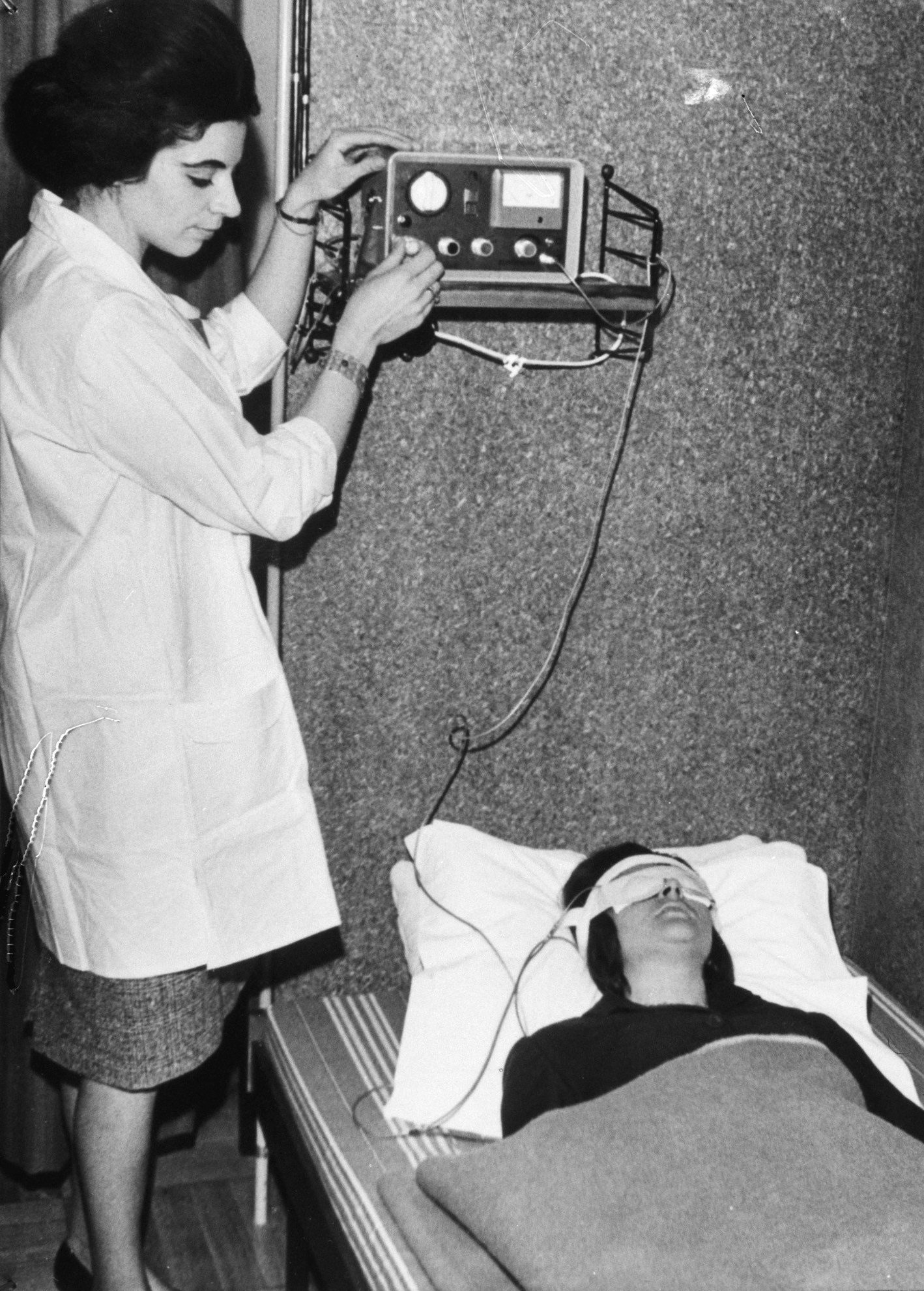
Sleep clinic

Behavioral sleep medicine (BSM) is a field within sleep medicine that encompasses scientific inquiry and clinical treatment of sleep-related disorders, with a focus on the psychological, physiological, behavioral, cognitive, social, and cultural factors that affect sleep, as well as the impact of sleep on those factors. The clinical practice of BSM is an evidence-based behavioral health discipline that uses primarily non-pharmacological treatments (that is, treatments that do not involve medications). BSM interventions are typically problem-focused and oriented towards specific sleep complaints, but can be integrated with other medical or mental health treatments (such as medical treatment of sleep apnea, psychotherapy for mood disorders). The primary techniques used in BSM interventions involve education and systematic changes to the behaviors, thoughts, and environmental factors that initiate and maintain sleep-related difficulties.

The most common sleep disorders that can benefit from BSM include insomnia, circadian rhythm sleep-wake disorders, nightmare disorder, childhood sleep disorders (for example bedwetting, bedtime difficulties), parasomnias (such as sleepwalking, sleep eating), sleep apnea-associated difficulties (such as difficulty using continuous positive airway pressure), and hypersomnia-associated difficulties (for example daytime fatigue and sleepiness, psychosocial functioning).

== Scope ==
The clinical practice of behavioral sleep medicine applies behavioral and psychological treatment strategies to sleep disorders. BSM specialists provide clinical services including assessment and treatment of sleep disorders and co-occurring psychological symptoms and disorders, often in conjunction with pharmacotherapy and medical devices that may be prescribed by medical professionals.

Most BSM treatments are based on behavioral therapy or cognitive behavioral therapy. Goals of BSM treatment include directly treating the sleep disorder (for example with cognitive behavioral therapy for insomnia), improving adherence to non-behavioral treatments (such as motivational enhancement for CPAP), and improving quality of life for people with chronic sleep disorders (for example, by using cognitive behavioral therapy for hypersomnia).

== Training and certification ==
Behavioral sleep medicine is a clinical specialty practiced by individuals who are licensed health professionals, including psychologists, counselors, social workers, physicians, nurses, physical therapists, and other healthcare professionals. Licensed BSM practitioners work in a variety of settings, including sleep clinics, hospitals, universities, outpatient mental health clinics, primary care, and private practice. Some scientists conduct behavioral sleep medicine research but are not licensed health providers and do not directly provide clinical treatment.

Training in behavioral sleep medicine varies. Training may be obtained during graduate clinical training, internship/residency, fellowship/postdoctoral training, or through continuing education courses.

The Society of Behavioral Sleep Medicine has established a certification process whereby licensed health professionals who have met certain training requirements can earn the title of Diplomate in Behavioral Sleep Medicine (DBSM). Requirements include graduate course work, specialized clinical training, and passing a written exam. This certification was previously known as Certification in Behavioral Sleep Medicine (CBSM).

== Diagnosis ==
Assessment methods used in behavioral sleep medicine are similar to those used in sleep medicine as a whole. Methods include clinical interview, sleep diaries, standardized questionnaires, polysomnography, actigraphy, and multiple sleep latency test (MSLT).

The third edition of the International Classification of Sleep Disorders (ICSD-3) contains the diagnostic criteria for sleep disorders. Many of these disorders are also described in the diagnostic manual of the American Psychiatric Association, the fifth edition of the Diagnostic and Statistical Manual of Mental Disorders (DSM-5).

=== Insomnia ===
Insomnia, which is the most common sleep disorder in the population as well as the most common disorder treated by BSM practitioners, is typically evaluated with a clinical interview and two weeks of sleep diaries. The clinical interview examines topics such as sleep patterns, sleep history, psychiatric history, medications, substance use, and relevant medical, developmental, social, occupational, cultural, and environmental factors. For young children, the clinical interview and sleep diaries would be completed primarily by a parent.

Standardized questionnaires may be used to evaluate the severity of the sleep problem or assess for other possible sleep problems. Example questionnaires commonly used with adults include: Insomnia Severity Index, Pittsburgh Sleep Quality Index, Epworth Sleepiness Scale, and STOP-Bang. The Brief Infant Sleep Questionnaire is commonly used to assess sleep/wake patterns in infants and small children. Questionnaires commonly used with children and their parents include: Children's Sleep Habits Questionnaire, the Pediatric Sleep Questionnaire, and the Children's Report of Sleep Patterns. Questionnaires commonly used with adolescents include: The Adolescent Sleep Wake Scale and the Adolescent Sleep Hygiene Scale.

Overnight sleep studies (polysomnography) are not necessary or recommended to diagnose insomnia. Polysomnography is used to rule out the presence of other disorders which may require medical treatment, such as sleep apnea, periodic limb movement disorder, and rapid eye movement sleep behavior disorder. An MSLT is used to rule out disorders of hypersomnolence such as narcolepsy.

Actigraphy is sometimes used to gain information about sleep timing and assess for possible circadian rhythm disorders.

=== Other sleep concerns ===
Assessment of other sleep concerns follow similar procedures to those for assessing insomnia. By the time individuals are referred to a BSM specialist, they have often already seen a sleep medicine provider and completed any necessary testing such as polysomnography, MSLT, or actigraphy. In that case, the BSM provider conducts a clinical interview and administers questionnaires if needed. Individuals are often asked to track their sleep or sleep-related symptoms such as nightmares or sleepwalking episodes that are the focus of treatment.

== Management ==
BSM practitioners provide evidence-based treatments developed for specific sleep disorders, including some that are published in clinical guidelines of organizations such as the American Academy of Sleep Medicine. BSM interventions are typically brief (between one and eight sessions), structured, and cognitive-behavioral in nature, aiming to provide the education and skills for individuals to become more independent in managing their sleep disorder.

=== Infants, children, and adolescents ===
The most common sleep complaints of parents of infants include requiring a parent or specific condition, like rocking, or bouncing, to fall asleep, and struggling to return to sleep during nighttime awakenings. Among toddlers and preschoolers, nighttime fears or resisting/stalling at bedtime (and therefore delaying sleep onset) are common, as well as bedtime co-sleeping with parents or siblings. In school-aged youth, problems with falling or staying asleep due to poor sleep hygiene are common.

Insufficient sleep (sleeping under the recommended 8–10 hours) is common in adolescence. The other most common sleep disorders of adolescence include insomnia and delayed sleep-wake phase disorder. High rates of insufficient sleep in adolescence are partially attributed to a mismatch between adolescent biology and school start times. Because adolescents experience a natural shift in their circadian rhythm around puberty (with a preference for later bedtimes and wake times), the American Academy of Pediatrics recommends that high schools start no earlier than 8:30am.

Evidence-based treatments for childhood behavioral sleep disorders vary by developmental level, but typically include heavy parental involvement. Interventions generally focus on:

- Stabilizing the timing of the sleep/wake schedule to be consistent on school nights and weekends
- Scheduling enough time in bed to meet clinical guidelines for developmentally appropriate sleep duration
- Promoting healthy bedtime routines that help prepare the body for sleep
- Empowering parents to set limits and rules around expected bedtime behavior
- Promoting independent sleep
- Promoting consistent sleep locations
- Addressing any other barriers to sleep onset (such as nightmares, bedtime fears, fear of the dark, anxiety, depression, pain or discomfort, etc.)
- Addressing family-level barriers to consistently wearing CPAP to treat obstructive sleep apnea and hypoventilation

Treatment with parents of infants emphasizes the implementation of safe sleeping practices in order to reduce the risk of sudden infant death syndrome. The recommends that infants 0–12 months of age sleep:

- On their back
- On their own protected sleep surface, such as a crib or other firm sleep surface, and not in the parent's bed, chair, or sofa
- With no heavy blankets, pillows, bumper pads or positioning devices near to them

=== Adults ===
Evidence-based treatments used to treat adult sleep-related disorders include:

- Cognitive behavioral therapy for insomnia (CBT-I). This is an evidence-based, non-pharmacological treatment for insomnia disorder that uses education and systematic changes to insomnia-related behaviors, thoughts, and environment to change the factors that maintain chronic difficulties with falling asleep, staying asleep, and getting restorative sleep. CBT-I is the first-line treatment for insomnia disorder as recommended by the American College of Physicians and American Academy of Sleep Medicine. It is effective for insomnia disorder that occurs alone or along with other medical or psychiatric symptoms.
- Intensive sleep retraining
- Mindfulness-based therapy for insomnia (MBTI)
- Imagery rehearsal therapy (IRT) for nightmare disorder
- Exposure, relaxation, and rescripting therapy (ERRT) for nightmare disorder
- Motivational enhancement therapy for improving adherence to CPAP treatment
- Exposure therapy for CPAP claustrophobia
- Behavioral therapy for circadian rhythm sleep-wake disorders
- Clinical hypnosis for NREM parasomnias
- Cognitive behavioral therapy for hypersomnia
- Sleep extension

== See also ==
- Behavioral medicine
