= Cognitive behavioral therapy for insomnia =

Technique for treating insomnia without (or alongside) medications

- Specialty: Psychiatry; psychology

Cognitive behavioral therapy for insomnia (CBT-I) is a therapy technique for treating insomnia without (or alongside) medications. CBT-I is the first-line treatment for insomnia and probably more efficacious and acceptable than pharmacotherapy. CBT-I aims to improve sleep habits and behaviors by identifying and changing thoughts and behaviors that prevent a person from sleeping well.

The first step in treating insomnia with CBT-I is to identify the underlying causes. People with insomnia should evaluate or have their sleep patterns evaluated and take into account all possible factors that may be affecting the person's ability to sleep. This may involve keeping a sleep diary/journal for a couple of weeks, which can help identify patterns of thoughts or behaviors, stressors, etc. that could be contributing to the person's insomnia.

After identifying the possible underlying causes and the factors contributing to insomnia, the person can begin taking steps toward getting better sleep. In CBT-I these steps include stimulus control, sleep hygiene, sleep restriction, relaxation training, and cognitive therapy. Some sleep specialists recommend biofeedback as well. Usually, several methods are combined into an overall treatment plan. Sleep restriction, stimulus control and cognitive therapy are suggested to be among the most efficacious components.

CBT-I is an effective form of treatment for traditional insomnia, as well as insomnia related to or caused by mood disorders, post-traumatic stress disorder, cancer, and other conditions.

== Components ==
According to this technique, the behavioral and cognitive practices to treat insomnia are sleep restriction (time-in-bed restriction), stimulus control (associate bed with sleep), and cognitive therapy.

=== Sleep hygiene ===
Sleep hygiene aims to control the environment and behaviors that precede sleep. This involves limiting substances that can interfere with proper sleep, particularly within 4–6 hours of going to bed. These substances include caffeine, nicotine and alcohol. Sometimes a light bedtime snack, such as milk or peanut butter, is recommended. The environment in which one sleeps, and the state in which one goes to bed, are addressed as well: sleep hygiene recommendations commonly advise minimising noise in the sleeping environment, and psychosocial stress is associated with increased pre-sleep arousal and impaired sleep, while stress management strategies have been shown to reduce that arousal. Nighttime use of television and other electronic devices falls outside the set of recommendations for which the evidence has been reviewed, and has been named as a factor requiring further investigation.

Although sleep hygiene is widely accepted, the evidence-base is still limited and the American Academy of Sleep Medicine clinical practice guideline recommends against sleep hygiene as a single-component therapy for the treatment of chronic insomnia disorder in adults.

=== Stimulus control ===
Stimulus control aims to associate the bed with sleeping and limit its association with stimulating behavior. People with insomnia are guided to do the following:

- Go to bed only when they are tired.
- Limit activities in bed to sleep and sex.
- Get out of bed at the same time every morning.
- Get up and move to another room when sleep onset does not occur within twenty minutes.

=== Sleep restriction therapy ===
Sleep restriction, also known as sleep restriction therapy, is probably the most difficult step of CBT-I. This is because CBT-I initially involves the restriction of sleep. Insomniacs typically spend a long time in bed not sleeping, which CBT-I sees as creating a mental association between the bed and insomnia. The bed, therefore, becomes a site of nightly frustration where it is difficult to relax. Although it is counterintuitive, sleep restriction is a significant and effective component of CBT-I. It involves controlling Time In Bed (TIB) based upon the person's sleep efficiency to restore the homeostatic drive to sleep and thereby re-enforce the "bed-sleep connection". Sleep Efficiency (SE) is the measure of reported Total Sleep Time (TST), the actual amount of time the patient is usually able to sleep, compared with their TIB.

Sleep efficiency = (Total sleep time)/(Time in bed)

- First, Time In Bed is restricted to some value, not less than 5 hours
- Increase or decrease TIB weekly by only 20-30 min (or by 15 minutes every five days)
- Increase TIB if SE > 90% (or 85%)
- Decrease TIB if SE < 80% (or 85%)

This process may take several weeks or months to complete, depending on the person's initial sleep efficiency and how effective the treatment is for them individually. (According to one expert, this should result in getting 7 to 8 hours of sleep within about six weeks.) Daytime sleepiness is a side-effect during the first week or two of treatment, so those who operate heavy machinery or otherwise cannot safely be sleep deprived should not undergo this process.

Research has shown that sleep restriction therapy does create side effects such as "fatigue/exhaustion", "extreme sleepiness", "reduced motivation/energy", "headache/migraine", irritability, and changes in appetite. But the frequency and ratings of how much these side effects interfered were associated with improvement in sleep quality over the course of the treatment. In another study, results of questionnaires measuring impairment through the psychomotor vigilance task (PVT) and the Epworth sleepiness scale (ESS) were stabilized at a normal level at 3-months follow-up.

Restricting sleep has also been shown to be an effective but usually temporary measure for treating depression.

=== Cognitive therapy ===
Cognitive therapy within CBT-I is not synonymous with versions of cognitive behavioral therapy that are not targeted at insomnia. When dealing with insomnia, cognitive therapy is mostly about offering education about sleep to target dysfunctional beliefs/attitudes about sleep.

Cognitive therapists will directly question the logical basis of these dysfunctional beliefs to point out their flaws. If applicable, the therapist will arrange a situation for the individual to test these flawed beliefs. For instance, many insomniacs believe that if they do not get enough sleep, they will be tired the entire following day. They will then try to conserve energy by not moving around or by taking a nap. These responses are understandable, but can exacerbate the problem since they do not generate energy. If instead a person actively tries to generate energy by taking a walk, talking to a friend, and getting plenty of sunlight, he or she may find that the original belief was self-fulfilling and not true.

The messages that the therapist tries to communicate to the patient are the following:

- Realistic expectations about sleep duration and the energy that the patient can expect the next day will help to manage the patient's dysfunctional thoughts about healthy sleep requirements.
- Insomnia cannot be blamed for all the deficits the patient is experiencing in their daytime life (not all problems will go away once the patient is able to sleep); this is important to know, because it takes some of the unrealistic expectations off sleep.
- It is not helpful to try to sleep – trying harder will only keep the patient more awake.
- Sleep should not be given too much importance in the patient's life – it should not be the point around which the patient's life revolves.
- Avoiding catastrophic thoughts after a night of unfulfilling sleep is key – insomnia is unpleasant, but not detrimental to health, at least short-term.
- Developing strategies to cope with recurring sleep problems may be helpful since patients with insomnia are more likely to experience sleep disturbances in the future.

Worry is a common factor in insomnia. Therapists will work to control worry and rumination with the use of a thought record, a log where a person writes down concerns. The therapist and the patient can then approach each of these concerns individually.

=== Relaxation training ===
Relaxation training is a collection of practices that can help people to relax throughout the day and, particularly, close to bedtime. It is useful for patients with insomnia who have difficulty falling asleep. However, it is unclear whether or not it is useful for those who tend to wake up in the middle of the night or very early in the morning. Techniques include hypnosis, guided imagery and meditation.

=== Paradoxical intention ===
Paradoxical intention is a treatment method that involves telling the patient to do the exact opposite of what they have been doing in bed: They should stay awake and avoid falling asleep. The goal of this method is to decrease performance anxiety which may inhibit sleep onset. Paradoxical intention is an effective treatment for sleep initiation insomnia but might not be effective for sleep maintenance or mixed insomnia.

== Treatment recommendation ==
=== Indication ===
CBT-I is indicated when the following criteria are met:

1. The patient complains about difficulties initiating or maintaining sleep. These difficulties cause significant distress and/or impact daily functioning. Complaints of non-restorative sleep without trouble initiating or maintaining sleep are excluded.
2. These difficulties are not primarily caused by a circadian rhythm disorder. In the case of a circadian rhythm disorder treatments such as phototherapy or chronobiologic interventions might be more suitable. However many primary insomnia patients also show some degree of a chronobiologic dysregulation, so a combination of CBT-I and chronobiologic interventions might be the best approach for these patients.
3. The patient does not have an undiagnosed or unstable medical or psychiatric illness that could interfere with or be worsened by CBT-I. For example, patients with severe major depression might not have the resources needed to accurately execute some CBT-I interventions, and failure in doing so might further reduce their self-efficacy. If it is likely that the insomnia will resolve with the resolution of the comorbid illness, specific treatment with CBT-I might not be necessary.
4. The patient shows some behavioral or psychological factors which play a part in the maintenance of the insomnia complaints. This could be behaviors such as going to bed early or taking naps during the day. Worries that interfere with sleep and somatized tension about insomnia may also be present. As CBT-I mainly targets these factors, at least one of them should be present.

CBT-I can be indicated for both primary and secondary insomnia. It primarily focuses on how patients deal with acute insomnia symptoms and how these symptoms are maintained and become chronic. These maintaining factors are often relevant in both primary and secondary insomnia.

=== Contraindication ===
Due to preexisting conditions or undesirable side effects, CBT-I can sometimes be an undesirable method of treatment. Some examples of this are:

- Stimulus control, which requires the patient to leave the bed and move to another room if they are not asleep within 15–20 minutes, can be dangerous for those with an elevated risk of falling, such as those with restricted mobility or with orthostatic hypotension.
- Relaxation training, which can be used during CBT-I, can lead to paradoxical anxiety. This might be the case for up to 15% of the patients. Those with generalized anxiety disorder, and some patients with major depressive disorder, can be more susceptible to this.
- Treatment of patients with bipolar disorder can increase the risk of switching from depression into mania; it might also increase daytime somnolence to such a degree that driving a car or operating machinery is no longer safe.
- Sleep restriction may aggravate other preexisting conditions. For example, sleep deprivation may act as a precipitant of epileptic seizures.

== Efficacy ==
Patients who have undergone CBT-I spend more time in sleep stages three and four (also known as slow-wave sleep, delta sleep, or deep sleep) and less time awake than those treated with zopiclone (also known as Imovane or Zimovane). They also had lasting benefits according to a review six months later, whereas zopiclone had no lasting results.

When the common hypnotic drug zolpidem (more commonly known as Ambien) was compared with CBT-I, the latter had a larger impact on sleep-onset insomnia. CBT-I by itself was no less effective than CBT-I paired with Ambien.

Computer-based CBT-I was shown to be comparable in effectiveness to therapist-delivered CBT-I in a placebo-controlled clinical study.

A meta-analysis showed that adherence and effectiveness are related in technology-mediated sleep treatment.

Where sleep anxiety is a cause of insomnia, some evidence suggests that components of CBT-I, such as sleep restriction, may worsen the anxiety. A CBT-derived variant known as acceptance and commitment therapy (ACT) may be more effective in these cases.

== Application of CBT-I for specific conditions ==
=== Mood disorders ===
Psychiatric mood disorders, such as major depressive disorder (MDD) and bipolar disorder, are intertwined with sleep disorders. Most people with psychiatric diagnoses have significantly reduced sleep efficiency and total sleep time compared to controls; in these cases, CBT-I can be used as a treatment option. A study in 2008 showed that augmenting antidepressant medication with CBT-I in patients with major depressive disorder and comorbid insomnia helped to alleviate symptoms for both disorders.

=== Post-traumatic stress disorders (PTSD) ===
Post-traumatic stress disorder (PTSD) and complex post-traumatic stress disorder (C-PTSD) are anxiety disorders that may develop after a person experiences a traumatic event. Common symptoms of PTSD include nightmares, flashbacks and hyperarousal (fight-or-flight), all of which can induce insomnia and fatigue in various ways.

Studies have shown that CBT-I can offer improvement for those with PTSD. The participants in studies displayed reduction of PTSD symptoms which lead to insomnia, such as nightmares and general fear of sleep after undergoing CBT-I.

Other studies suggest that CBT-I in combination with imagery rehearsal therapy further lessens sleep-related PTSD symptoms. Imagery rehearsal therapy (IRT) is a modified cognitive behavioral therapy technique used to treat recurring nightmares. This technique involves recalling the nightmare, writing it down, modifying parts of the dream to make it positive, and rehearsing the new dream to create a cognitive shift that counters the original dream.

=== Cancer ===
Cancer patients often experience insomnia due to psychological, behavioral or physical consequences of cancer diagnosis and treatment. Insomnia can affect cancer patients along the trajectory of their treatment and potentially into survivorship. Thus, cancer survivors are also at risk. Systematic reviews and meta-analysis have noted that insomnia is highly common ("up to 70%") with cancer survivors. CBT-I is also a viable insomnia treatment option for survivors. CBT-I has been shown to be an effective treatment in these cases as it may improve sleep quality, mood, overall quality of life and lessen fatigue. CBT-I is also the most effective intervention method at reducing insomnia for cancer patients compared to other nonpharmacological interventions.

Compared to other interventions, such as medications or other therapies, CBT-I demonstrated the most effective for reducing insomnia in cancer patients. CBT-I does not rely on pharmaceutical interventions for insomnia relief for cancer patients, or to produce insomnia relief for those cancer survivors who have completed treatment. Instead, the therapy focuses directly on the patient to help identify and change related psychosocial components or thoughts in cancer patients and cancer survivors that cause insomnia. Several systematic reviews and meta-analyses, including work with colleagues by Garland, Johnson, and Squires, found that CBT-I helps reduce cancer patient and cancer survivor insomnia symptoms, improves sleep efficiency, and contributes to a lasting better overall quality of life.

CBT-I research specifically for cancer populations also primarily focuses on breast cancer (BC) populations, potentially limiting the broad application of certain findings. BC patients have some of the highest rates of insomnia when comparing to other cancers, which explains why there is this research focus. Multiple factors contribute to this high insomnia rate from the management of, as well as, the treatments for breast cancer patients and survivors. Meta-analysis has demonstrated that CBT-I is an effective intervention "for reducing insomnia and improving sleep quality in women for BC" with durable effect.

While CBT-I has been recognized to reduce insomnia for cancer survivors, most of the research done to demonstrate this impact has not been representative of racial and ethnic minority cancer survivors. In a recent large systematic study to determine this representation, it was revealed that the majority of studies displaying CBT-I as the “gold standard treatment of insomnia” for cancer survivors, were performed on primarily non-Hispanic White participants. These results indicate that the effectiveness of CBT-I "cannot be generalized beyond White cancer survivors" because different results may occur if applied to racially and ethnically diverse participants. Future research must include these participants to provide accurate recommendations and to ensure diversity and inclusion.

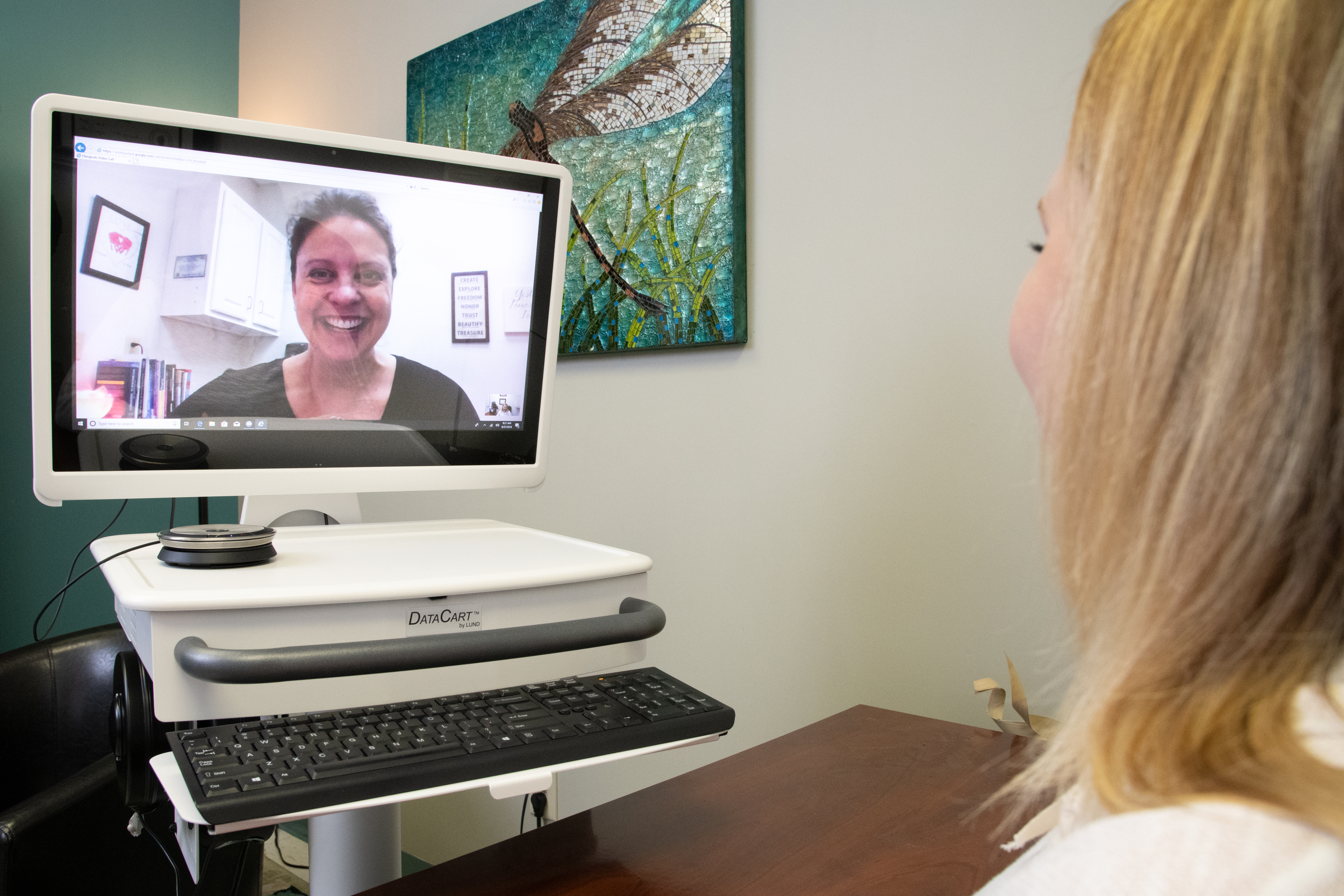
Telehealth Session

Traditional and typical CBT-I has been delivered in both individual and group delivery CBT-I formats, although research has confirmed that other formats are equally effective where face-to-face CBT-I is not feasible for cancer patients and survivors. There is growing research investigating the effectiveness of CBT-I for cancer patients and survivors delivered through online or digital methods. This kind of digital CBT-I, also known generally as computerized CBT-I, iCBT-I and more, has been found to be effective. Current findings support the efficacy of internet-delivered CBT-I for cancer survivors and had similar lasting effects across these delivery formats. Digital CBT-I involves the essential components of CBT-I delivered through online mediums such as apps, Telehealth services, etc. The clinical use of digital CBT-I can range from a supplementary tool after in-person therapy sessions to a fully online therapy practice. Digital CBT-I also allows more people to access this therapy, provides a greater sense of confidentiality for patients, and may increase clinicians' efficiency in delivering this treatment by making workloads more manageable.

=== Other conditions ===
In studies examining sufferers of chronic pain induced insomnia via hyperarousal, CBT-I has been shown to improve sleep continuity and reduce impairment in daily functioning.

CBT-I is effective in geriatric patients with insomnia as well. Medication might be problematic in such patients due to contraindications, and they might prefer psychotherapy over medication, therefore, it should be considered as a treatment option for them.

== Alternative treatment options ==
Some therapies can be applied as complementary or as an alternative to CBT-I.

Acceptance and mindfulness techniques can be used in addition to CBT-I, as some insomnia patients can benefit from concepts such as acceptance and cognitive defusion. In the case of insomnia, this would mean nonjudgmental acceptance of fluctuations in the ability to fall asleep and sleep-interfering thoughts and feelings, as well as cognitive detachment from dysfunctional beliefs and automatic thoughts. A 2014 study suggests that acceptance and commitment therapy might even be effective in patients not responding to CBT-I.

Biofeedback is an effective treatment for insomnia and is listed in the American Academy of Sleep Medicine treatment guidelines. This form of therapy includes visual or auditory feedback of e.g. EEG or EMG activity. This can help insomnia patients to control their physiological arousal.

There has also been research into the utility of the individual components of CBT-I when delivered as monotherapies or multi-component therapies without cognitive therapy. A 2023 systematic review demonstrated that just stimulus control and sleep restriction are effective treatment options for insomnia in older adults. It also indicated that when combined, they generate improvements with a magnitude similar to that of full CBT-I, in as little as two therapeutic sessions.
