= Non-restorative sleep =

Medical symptom

Non-restorative sleep (NRS), also known as unrefreshing sleep, is a subjective symptom in which sleep is experienced as insufficiently refreshing and hence subjective sleep quality as poor. This can be despite the appearance of otherwise normal sleep, like adequate sleep duration and lack of nighttime awakenings. NRS is associated with daytime cognitive dysfunction, affective symptoms, fatigue, sleepiness, and increased pain sensitivity. It is diagnosed exclusively via self-report or sleep questionnaires.

== Conditions ==
NRS is often a symptom of sleep disorders such as insomnia and shift work sleep disorder. It can also occur in hypersomnia and narcolepsy. In addition, NRS is frequently a symptom of conditions like fibromyalgia, myalgic encephalomyelitis/chronic fatigue syndrome (ME/CFS), long COVID, autoimmune disorders like rheumatoid arthritis and systemic lupus erythematosus (SLE), and infections. NRS has been especially associated with fibromyalgia and ME/CFS, with approximately 65 to 95% of people with fibromyalgia and 85 to 95% of people with ME/CFS reporting unrefreshing sleep. NRS may in fact be causally related to cognitive impairment, fatigue, and myalgia (muscle pain) in people with fibromyalgia and ME/CFS. Other conditions associated with NRS include sleep apnea, periodic limb movement disorder (PLMD), and chronic pain. Psychiatric disorders such as depression or anxiety have been associated with NRS as well. On the other hand, NRS can occur without any comorbidity.

== Correlates ==
Older age is strongly correlated with NRS, although conflicting findings exist. Women experience NRS more often than men, though this is likewise not always observed. Relatedly, in the case of fibromyalgia, which is characterized by very high rates of NRS, more than 90% of people with this condition are women. People who are unemployed or retired have been found to experience more NRS than employed people. Shift workers have a relatively high level of NRS. Moderate to high stress has been associated with NRS. Fatigue and NRS are correlated with each other. Tinnitus frequently occurs in conditions in which unrefreshing sleep is present at high rates including ME/CFS, fibromyalgia, and long COVID, and is further associated with sleep disorders and poor sleep quality, with non-restorative sleep possibly causative of tinnitus.

== Causes ==
Research on the mechanisms underlying NRS are controversial and inconclusive. NRS is correlated with sleep onset latency and to a lesser extent with sleep duration. The symptom might be due to disturbance of slow wave sleep (SWS; non-REM sleep or "deep sleep") and due to insufficiently deep sleep. Alternatively or additionally, it might be related to REM sleep deprivation.

Pro-inflammatory cytokines such as interleukin-1β (IL-1β), interleukin-6 (IL-6), and tumor necrosis factor α (TNFα), among others, are sleep-regulating mediators that may have negative effects on sleep with chronic exposure and increase the likelihood of NRS. These cytokines vary with the sleep–wake cycle, increasing with duration of wakefulness, and are highest with sleep propensity. In addition, they increase with sleep loss, and inhibitors of these cytokines can reduce sleep rebound after sleep deprivation. Many of the symptoms of sleep deprivation, such as sleepiness, fatigue, depression, cognitive and memory impairment, and increased pain sensitivity, can be mimicked by exogenous administration of interleukin-1 (IL-1) or TNFα. Pro-inflammatory cytokines such as TNFα are known to be elevated in conditions including ME/CFS, chronic insomnia, excessive daytime sleepiness, sleep apnea, and various inflammatory and autoimmune conditions. Findings of the influence of pro-inflammatory cytokines on sleep provide a possible mechanism by which immune disorders and related conditions may affect sleep and lead to NRS.

== Treatment ==
There is little information available on treatment of NRS as of 2008. Treatments that might be helpful in some cases of NRS include behavioral measures like cognitive–behavioral therapy (CBT) and hypnotherapy, exercise, hypnotics, and certain antidepressants. Some hypnotics have been found to improve slow wave sleep (SWS), such as sodium oxybate (γ-hydroxybutyrate (GHB); Xyrem) and gaboxadol, and hypnotics of this sort might be more useful than other hypnotics in the treatment of NRS, though more research is needed to substantiate such notions.

Sodium oxybate is used as a hypnotic in the treatment of narcolepsy and uniquely improves sleep quality as well as symptoms like daytime sleepiness and cataplexy in people with this condition. The drug also underwent and completed formal clinical development for treatment of fibromyalgia. This condition is characterized by very high rates of NRS, and sodium oxybate was shown to increase SWS in people with the condition. Relatedly, the drug not only improved sleep and insomnia in people with fibromyalgia, but also moderately improved general symptoms such as pain and fatigue as well as multiple quality of life measures. However, sodium oxybate was ultimately not granted regulatory approval for treatment of fibromyalgia, owing mostly to concerns about potential misuse. In addition, the drug has garnered a reputation as a date-rape drug, with diversion concerns, although the actual prevalence of this use appears to be much lower than popular perception. Besides fibromyalgia, sodium oxybate might also be useful for treatment of NRS in other conditions like ME/CFS and long COVID. Due to its very short elimination half-life, sodium oxybate must be administered twice per night, with the second dose being taken 4 hours after the first. However, in 2023, an extended-release once-nightly formulation was introduced. In addition, a once-nightly prodrug known as valiloxybate (XW-10172) is being developed.

Targeting of individual pro-inflammatory cytokines such as tumor necrosis factor α (TNFα), interleukin-1β, and interferon has been explored to improve sleep and associated symptoms such as fatigue. This has resulted in some success in certain conditions and situations, for instance against sleepiness and fatigue in people with rheumatoid arthritis. However, many relevant conditions are complex with multiple pathways being activated, and as such targeting single cytokines may not have the desired effect, with this having been observed for instance in sepsis.
