= Cataplexy =

Symptom of narcolepsy

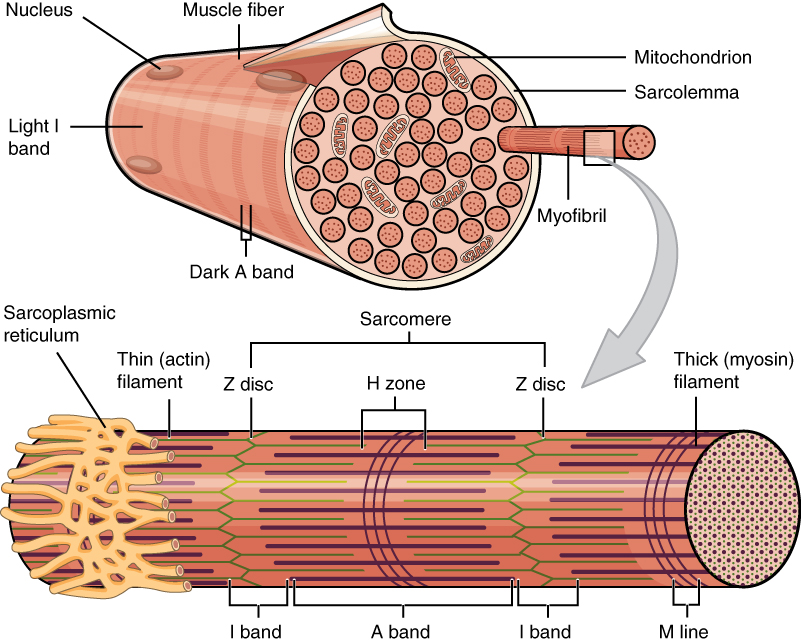
- Organization of skeletal muscle; in cataplexy, the skeletal muscles are often affected.
- Pronunciation: /ˈkætəˌplɛksi/
- Specialty: Neurology, psychiatry
- Symptoms: Muscle weakness
- Causes: Trauma, narcolepsy

Cataplexy is a sudden and transient episode of muscle weakness accompanied by full conscious awareness, typically triggered by emotions such as laughing, crying, or terror. Cataplexy is the first symptom to appear in about 10% of cases of narcolepsy, caused by an autoimmune destruction of hypothalamic neurons that produce the neuropeptide hypocretin (also called orexin), which regulates arousal and has a role in stabilization of the transition between wake and sleep states. Cataplexy without narcolepsy is rare and the cause is unknown.

The term cataplexy originates from the Greek κατά (kata, meaning "down"), and πλῆξις (plēxis, meaning "strike") and it was first used around 1880 in German physiology literature to describe the phenomenon of tonic immobility also known as "playing possum" (in reference to the opossum's behavior of feigning death when threatened). In the same year the French neuropsychiatrist Jean-Baptiste Gélineau coined the term 'narcolepsy' and published some clinical reports that contained details about two patients who had similar conditions to those of current narcoleptic cases. Nevertheless, the onset that he reported was in adulthood, as compared to current cases reported in childhood and adolescence. Even if he preferred the term 'astasia' instead of 'cataplexy', the case that he described remains iconic for the diagnosis of full narcoleptic syndrome.

== Signs and symptoms ==
Cataplexy manifests itself as muscular weakness that may range from a barely perceptible slackening of the facial muscles to complete muscle paralysis with postural collapse. Attacks are brief, most lasting from a few seconds to a couple of minutes, and typically involve dropping of the jaw, neck weakness, and/or buckling of the knees. Even in a full-blown collapse, people are usually able to avoid injury because they learn to notice the feeling of the cataplectic attack approaching, and the fall is usually slow and progressive. Speech may be slurred and vision may be impaired (double vision, inability to focus), but hearing and awareness remain normal.

Cataplexy attacks are self-limiting and resolve without the need for medical intervention. If the person is reclining comfortably, they may transition into sleepiness, hypnagogic hallucinations, or a period of REM sleep. While cataplexy worsens with fatigue, it is different from narcoleptic sleep attacks and is usually, but not always, triggered by strong emotional reactions such as laughter, anger, surprise, awe, and embarrassment, or by sudden physical effort, especially if the person is caught off guard. One well-known example of this was the reaction of 1968 Olympic long jump medalist Bob Beamon on learning that he had broken the previous world record by over 0.5 meters (almost 2 feet). Cataplectic attacks may occasionally occur spontaneously, with no identifiable emotional trigger.

== Mechanism ==
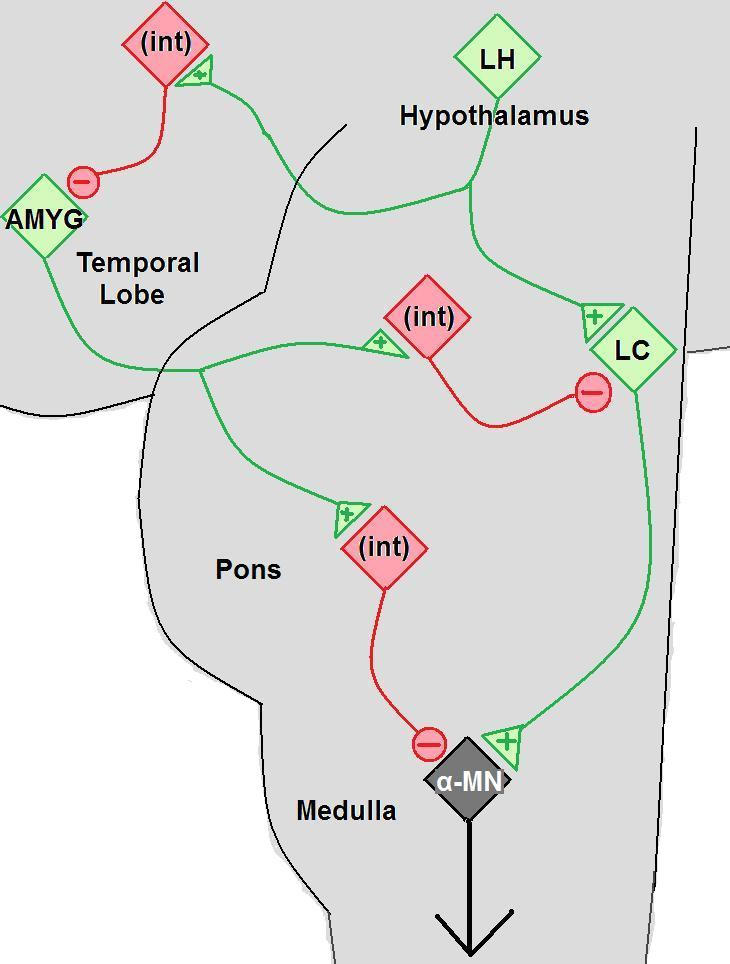
In this simplified brain circuit, damage to orexin-secreting neurons in the hypothalamus can lead to inhibition of motor neurons, thus lowering muscle tone.

Cataplexy is considered secondary when it is due to specific lesions in the brain that cause a depletion of the hypocretin neurotransmitter. Secondary cataplexy is associated with specific lesions located primarily in the lateral and posterior hypothalamus. Cataplexy due to brainstem lesions is uncommon, particularly when seen in isolation. The lesions include tumors of the brain or brainstem and arteriovenous malformations. Some of the tumors include astrocytoma, glioblastoma, glioma, and subependymoma. These lesions can be visualized with brain imaging, although in their early stages they can be missed in imaging. Other conditions in which cataplexy can be seen include ischemic events, multiple sclerosis, head injury, paraneoplastic syndromes, infections such as encephalitis, and more rarely Niemann Pick disease. Cataplexy may also occur transiently or permanently due to lesions of the hypothalamus that were caused by surgery, especially in difficult tumor resections. These lesions or generalized processes disrupt the hypocretin neurons and their pathways. The neurological process behind the lesion impairs pathways controlling the normal inhibition of muscle tone drop, consequently resulting in muscle atonia.

=== Theories for episodes ===
Muscular paralysis, a phenomenon of REM sleep, occurs at an inappropriate time. This loss of tonus is caused by massive inhibition of motor neurons in the spinal cord. When this happens during waking, the patient who had a cataplectic attack loses muscular control. As in REM sleep, the person continues to breathe and is able to control eye movements.

=== Hypocretin ===
The hypothalamus region of the brain regulates basic functions of hormone release, emotional expression and sleep. One study concluded that the neurochemical hypocretin, also known as orexin, which is regulated by the hypothalamus, was significantly reduced in study participants with symptoms of cataplexy. Hypocretin regulates sleep and states of arousal. Hypocretin deficiency is further associated with decreased levels of histamine and epinephrine, chemicals important in promoting wakefulness, arousal and alertness.

== Diagnosis ==
The diagnosis of narcolepsy and cataplexy is usually made by symptom presentation. Presenting with the four symptoms (excessive daytime sleepiness, sleep-onset paralysis, hypnagogic hallucinations, and cataplexy symptoms) is strong evidence of the diagnosis of narcolepsy. A multiple sleep latency test is often conducted to quantify daytime sleepiness.

Cataplexy can sometimes be misdiagnosed as a seizure disorder, and people with narcolepsy are often misdiagnosed with other conditions such as psychiatric disorders or emotional problems. As a result, it can take years for someone to get the proper diagnosis.

== Treatment ==
Cataplexy is treated with medications. Treatment for narcolepsy and cataplexy can be divided to those that act on the excessive daytime sleepiness (EDS) and those that improve cataplexy. Most patients require lifelong use of medications. Most treatments in humans will act only symptomatically and do not target the loss of the orexin-producing neurons.

When treating cataplexy, all three systems—adrenergic, cholinergic and dopaminergic—must be considered. The adrenergic system can be inhibited by antidepressants. In mouse models, cataplexy is regulated by the dopaminergic system via the D2-like receptor, which when blocked decreases cataplectic attacks. The role of the cholinergic system has been observed in canine models, where stimulation of this system may lead to severe cataplexy episodes.

There are no behavioral treatments. People with narcolepsy will often try to avoid thoughts and situations that they know are likely to evoke strong emotions and thereby trigger cataplectic attacks.

=== Gamma-hydroxybutyrate ===
Gamma-hydroxybutyrate, also known as sodium oxybate, has been found to be effective at reducing the number of cataplexy episodes. Sodium oxybate is generally safe and is typically the recommended treatment.

Sodium oxybate is a natural metabolite of GABA. Its main target is the dopaminergic system because at pharmacological concentrations it acts as an agonist and modulates the dopamine neurotransmitters and dopaminergic signalling. It is the only drug authorised by the EMA to treat the whole disease in adults, and by the FDA to treat patients who have cataplexy with the indication to be used for combating excessive daytime sleepiness. This drug helps to normalise sleep architecture and inhibits the intrusion of REM sleep elements like paralysis during the day.

=== Antidepressants ===
If the above treatment is not possible, venlafaxine is recommended. Evidence supporting its effectiveness is primarily based on clinical experience rather than extensive clinical trials.

Previous treatments include tricyclic antidepressants such as imipramine, clomipramine or protriptyline. Monoamine oxidase inhibitors may be used to manage both cataplexy and the REM sleep-onset symptoms of sleep paralysis and hypnagogic hallucinations.

In clinical practice, venlafaxine and clomipramine are the most common antidepressants used to treat cataplexy. If the patient wishes to have a sedative effect, then clomipramine is prescribed. The effect of these drugs is to suppress the REM component and to increase the brainstem monoaminergic levels. Improvement can be seen within 48 hours after the drug is administered and at doses smaller than the ones used in depression. Nonetheless, antidepressants are not approved by the FDA for the treatment of cataplexy; some jurisdictions have approved clomipramine for this use, however. Frequently, tolerance is developed by the patients and typically the risk of cataplexy rebound, or "status cataplecticus", appears when their intake is abruptly interrupted.

=== Future treatments ===
==== Immune-based therapies ====
Narcolepsy with cataplexy is considered an autoimmune-mediated disorder, so some therapies based on this hypothesis have been developed. Immunological therapies developed include:

- Corticosteroids: after testing in 1 human and 1 canine case it proved to be ineffective, so is less likely to be further used.
- Intravenous immunoglobulins (IVIgs): it may decrease the symptoms but its effectiveness is still subjective and unconfirmed by the placebo-controlled trials. It was suggested that sometimes it might have life-threatening side effects. Nevertheless, after giving this treatment to a patient with undetectable orexin levels in the cerebrospinal fluid after only 15 days after the disease onset, the cataplexy was improved and the orexin levels started to normalise.
- Plasmapheresis: should be similar with IVIgs but it is more invasive, and for it even less data is available.
- Immunoadsorption
- Alemtuzumab

==== Histaminergic H3 receptor inverse agonist ====
The histaminergic neurons have a very important role in preserving consciousness and in helping maintain wakefulness and remain active during cataplexy. In narcolepsy, there seems to be an increase in these neurons, possibly to compensate for hypocretin loss. A promising therapy would be to increase the activation of histaminergic neurons by an inverse agonist of the histamine H3 receptor, which enhances histamine release in hypothalamus. An inverse agonist of the histamine H3 is Pitolisant. Results after testing on animals have indicated increased wakefulness in normal animals, decreased sleepiness and blocked the abnormal transitions from REM sleep to awake state in the hypocretin knock-out mice. Placebo-controlled studies also suggest some positive effects of Pitolisant on cataplexy symptoms increasing the levels of alertness and wakefulness.

== Protective devices ==
There are several protective devices used that can help to manage the dangers as a results of falls due to cataplexies:

- Orthopedic helmets: A protective orthopedic helmet can help prevent severe head injuries in case of falls.
- Wheelchair: People with cataplexies may experience falls or other dangerous situations outside their home. A wheelchair can provide a safe and comfortable way for them to move around and should be used as part of standard therapy in those with more than two to three cataplectic attacks per week.
- Crutches: These devices can help them maintain balance and slow down possible falls.
- Orthoses: Orthoses are devices that are worn on the body to support or correct the alignment of the joints. They can be used to help people with narcolepsy maintain their balance and prevent falls.
- Alarm devices: Alarm devices, such as a bed alarm or a wearable alarm, can be used to alert caregivers or family members if the person with narcolepsy is about to fall asleep unexpectedly.

It is advised for people with narcolepsy and cataplexy to work with their healthcare team to determine the most beneficial protective devices for their specific needs and to ensure their safety and well-being.

== Research ==
Research is being conducted on hypocretin gene therapy and hypocretin cell transplantation for narcolepsy-cataplexy.

== See also ==
- Neurodegenerative disease
- Niemann Pick disease
