= Epworth Sleepiness Scale =

Scale to measure daytime sleepiness via a questionnaire

- Purpose: diagnose sleep disorder

The Epworth Sleepiness Scale (ESS) is a scale intended to measure daytime sleepiness that is measured by use of a very short questionnaire. This can be helpful in diagnosing sleep disorders. It was introduced in 1991 by Dr Murray Johns of Epworth Hospital in Melbourne, Australia.

== The questionnaire ==
The ESS is a self-reported questionnaire, and the evidence base for its measurement properties is limited. A systematic review found relatively few high-quality studies and concluded that its internal consistency supports group-level but not individual-level comparisons. Scores may also vary with the method of administration: in a study of sleep clinic patients, scores obtained during physician administration were systematically lower than those completed by patients themselves.

The questionnaire asks the subject to rate their probability of falling asleep on a scale of increasing probability from 0 to 3 for eight different situations that most people engage in during their daily lives, though not necessarily every day. The scores for the eight questions are added together to obtain a single number. A number in the 0–9 range is considered to be normal while a number in the 10–24 range indicates that expert medical advice should be sought. For instance, scores of 11–15 are shown to indicate the possibility of mild to moderate sleep apnea, where a score of 16 and above indicates the possibility of severe sleep apnea or narcolepsy. Certain questions in the scale were shown to be better predictors of specific sleep disorders, though further tests may be required to provide an accurate diagnosis.

The questionnaire was originally created with the intent to preserve the exact wording of the questionnaire to provide a standardised test and preserve its validity. Johns, the author of the ESS, recommends that the administrator of the questionnaire does not discuss the results of the test with the subject until it is completed, as it could affect the subject's responses on the questionnaire.

An interactive calculator is available that utilises the 1997 version of the ESS. It automatically provides the score based on the responses to the ESS questions.

== Calibration ==
The Epworth Sleepiness Scale has been validated primarily in obstructive sleep apnea, though it has also shown success in detecting narcolepsy and idiopathic hypersomnia. It is used to measure excessive daytime sleepiness and is repeated after the administration of treatment (e.g., CPAP) to document improvement of symptoms. In narcolepsy, the ESS has both a high specificity (100%) and sensitivity (93.5%).

The Epworth Sleepiness Scale has been used to compare the sensitivity and specificity of other similar measurements of sleep quality. The Pittsburgh Sleep Quality Index is a related scoring tool of sleep quality. Both scores are internally highly reproducible.
