= Excessive daytime sleepiness =

Symptom characterized by persistent sleepiness

- Other names: Hypersomnolence
- Specialty: Psychiatry, Neurology, Sleep medicine
- Symptoms: Persistent sleepiness during the day despite adequate nighttime sleep
- Causes: Narcolepsy, idiopathic hypersomnia, circadian rhythm sleep disorder, sleep apnea, others

Excessive daytime sleepiness (EDS) is characterized by persistent sleepiness and often a general lack of energy, even during the day after apparently adequate or even prolonged nighttime sleep. EDS can be considered as a broad condition encompassing several sleep disorders where increased sleep is a symptom, or as a symptom of another underlying disorder like narcolepsy, circadian rhythm sleep disorder, sleep apnea or idiopathic hypersomnia.

Some persons with EDS, including those with hypersomnias like narcolepsy and idiopathic hypersomnia, are compelled to nap repeatedly during the day, fighting off increasingly strong urges to sleep during inappropriate times such as while driving, while at work, during a meal, or in conversations. As the compulsion to sleep intensifies, the ability to complete tasks sharply diminishes, often mimicking the appearance of intoxication. During occasional unique and/or stimulating circumstances, a person with EDS can sometimes remain animated, awake and alert, for brief or extended periods of time. EDS can affect the ability to function in family, social, occupational, or other settings. A proper diagnosis of the underlying cause and ultimately treatment of symptoms and/or the underlying cause can help mitigate such complications. According to the National Sleep Foundation, around 20 percent of people experience EDS.

== Causes ==
EDS can be a symptom of a number of factors and disorders. Specialists in sleep medicine are trained to diagnose them. Some are:

- Insufficient quality or quantity of night time sleep
- Obstructive sleep apnea
- Misalignments of the body's circadian pacemaker with the environment (e.g., jet lag, shift work, or other circadian rhythm sleep disorders)
- Another underlying sleep disorder, such as narcolepsy, sleep apnea, idiopathic hypersomnia, or restless legs syndrome
- Disorders such as clinical depression or atypical depression
- Tumors, head trauma, anemia, kidney failure, hypothyroidism, or an injury to the central nervous system
- Drug abuse
- Genetic predisposition
- Vitamin deficiency, such as biotin deficiency
- Particular classes of prescription and over-the-counter medication
- Long COVID

== Diagnosis ==
An adult who is compelled to nap repeatedly during the day may have excessive daytime sleepiness (EDS); however, it is important to distinguish between occasional daytime sleepiness and EDS, which is chronic.

A number of tools for screening for EDS have been developed. One is the Epworth Sleepiness Scale (ESS) which grades the results of a questionnaire with eight questions referring to situations encountered in daily life. The ESS generates a numerical score from zero (0) to 24 where a score of ten [10] or higher may indicate that the person should consult a specialist in sleep medicine for further evaluation.

Another tool is the Multiple Sleep Latency Test (MSLT), which has been used since the 1970s. It is used to measure the time it takes from the start of a daytime nap period to the first signs of sleep, called sleep latency. Subjects undergo a series of five 20-minute sleeping opportunities with an absence of alerting factors at 2-hour intervals on one day. The test is based on the idea that the sleepier people are, the faster they will fall asleep.

The Maintenance of Wakefulness Test (MWT) is also used to quantitatively assess daytime sleepiness. This test is performed in a sleep diagnostic center. The test is similar to the MSLT as it also relies on a measurement of initial sleep latency. However, during this test, the patient is instructed to try to stay awake under soporific conditions for a defined time.

The use of electroencephalography (EEG) readings is essential for the objective diagnosis of EDS. The initial sleep latency employed in the MSLT and the MWT is mainly derived from EEG recordings. Moreover, power characteristics in the alpha-band of resting-state EEG readings, correlating with somnolence, also showed a correlation with the presence of EDS.

== Treatment ==
Treatment of excessive daytime sleepiness (EDS) relies on identifying and treating the underlying disorder which may cure the person from the EDS. Drugs like modafinil, armodafinil, pitolisant (Wakix), sodium oxybate (Xyrem) oral solution, have been approved as treatment for EDS symptoms in the United States. There is declining usage of other drugs such as methylphenidate (Ritalin), dextroamphetamine (Dexedrine), amphetamine, lisdexamfetamine (Vyvanse), methamphetamine (Desoxyn), and pemoline (Cylert), as these stimulants may have several adverse effects.

If EDS is caused by obstructive sleep apnea (OSA), it is recommended that people with OSA use continuous positive airway pressure (CPAP) therapy, that is a sleep breathing apparatus to prevent OSA, before starting intake of wake-promoting agents such as modafinil.

== See also ==
- Kleine–Levin syndrome
- List of investigational narcolepsy and hypersomnia drugs
