= Non-image-forming vision =

Non-image-forming vision (NIFV) is a form of vision that is mediated by the retina. It is responsible for detecting light in the external environment and transmitting this information through the intrinsically photosensitive retinal ganglion cells (ipRGCs) to the suprachiasmatic nucleus (SCN, for photoentrainment of the biological clocks) and the olivary pretectal nucleus (OPN, for controlling pupil size). NIFV has also been proven to be important for the regulation of pineal melatonin secretion and the sleep-wake cycle. This is in direct contrast to image-forming vision (IFV) which is also mediated by the retina but instead facilitates the discrimination of object shapes, colors, and motion in the visual field.

While the rod and cone photoreceptor cells are involved in NIFV, a novel photopigment contained in the ipRGCs (melanopsin) was also discovered to play a role in this visual pathway. Various key studies by A. E. Hopkins, Charles Keeler, Shizufumi Ebihara, Keiichiro Tsuji, Russel Foster, Charles Czeisler, and Ignacio Provencio helped to both elucidate this finding and to decipher the role of the ipRGCs in the NIFV mechanism. More recently, clinical implications of NIFV (in the pupillary light response, seasonal affective disorder (SAD), glaucoma, inherited mitochondrial optic neuropathy, sleep dysregulation with aging, photophobia in migraine, neonatal light avoidance, and prenatal ocular development) have also been uncovered.

Today, research regarding NIFV is still ongoing. A common misconception is that NIFV functions as a completely separate system from IFV. A 2025 study by Yiming Shi and colleagues, however, has now shown ipRGC activation to also be involved in various IFV features, including orientation discriminability in mice and humans. This is thought to occur via ipRGC influence on the excitatory and inhibitory neurons of the primary visual cortex (V1).

== Discovery ==
=== Early studies ===
In the field of chronobiology, various early studies sought to establish the role of the mammalian eye in generating circadian rhythms. In 1923, a series of experiments by A.E. Hopkins demonstrated that blind mice (who did not contain rod cells in their eyes) could perceive differences in brightness. This suggested that the mice were not fully blind. Rather, this discovery suggested the presence of additional retinal cells (now known as the ipRGCs) and a novel photoreceptor (now known as melanopsin) that could respond to light and, hence, mediate the NIFV response. Later, in 1927, Charles Keeler also discovered that blind mice retain normal pupil constriction/dilation. This once again suggested that the blind mice could somehow respond to light, another early indication of NIFV.

=== Critical studies ===
With Keeler and Hopkins laying the foundation for NIFV, the hunt began to discover the pathway and the novel photoreceptor that controlled it. In the 1980s, many researchers began to draw parallels between the novel photoreceptor and circadian photoentrainment due to its previously-described role in processing photic information. Shizufumi Ebihara and Keiichiro Tsuji first hypothesized that rod cells were necessary for photoentrainment due to their extreme light sensitivity. Russel Foster, however, challenged this through an experiment that utilized retinally degenerate (rd/rd) mice. These mice (who lacked both rod and cone cells) could still properly entrain and phase shift to pulses of light. Thus, Foster concluded that light information must be able to be detected by a novel photoreceptor (melanopsin) and to be transmitted to the brain through a pathway distinct from that of IFV. These results were further supported with experiments by Robert Lucas in which mice with both rod and cone degeneration still presented daily rhythms in melatonin. Later on, in humans, Charles Czeisler also showed that blind individuals who exhibited responses to light (ie. pupillary dilation/constriction) likewise exhibited melatonin suppression when exposed to bright light pulses. This supported the findings in mice, again alluding to NIFV.

=== Recent studies and future directions ===
Research regarding NIFV did not end with the discoveries of melanopsin and the ipRGCs. In the 2025 study of Yiming Shi and colleagues, the role of the ipRGCs in orientation selectivity and feature processing has been established. Other studies have sought to understand how the cognitive controls of NIFV and IFV differ, with experiments suggesting that covert visual attention does not modulate NIFV.

Future directions of the field are now focused on understanding the relationship between human behavior, our changing light environment, and NIFV. The 2023 review of Islay Campbell and colleagues, for example, discusses the downstream effects of light-emitting diodes (LEDs) on NIFV pathways. Here, the 2022 discovery of Renske Lok and colleagues (that long exposure to LEDs during the day improves cognitive function) is noted. Future research is thus aimed at exploring the NIFV mechanisms that drive cognitive change and how different light levels may alter NIFV circuitry.

== Mechanism ==
=== Overview ===
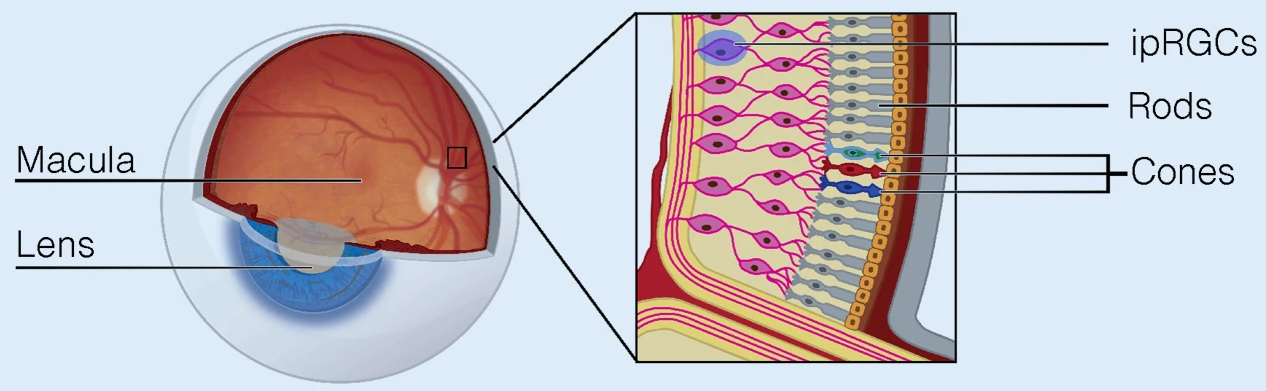
Diagrammatic depiction of the retinal photoreceptors. ipRGCs, Rods, and Cones are labeled.

While IFV relies on retinal rod and cone photoreceptor cells, NIFV may also utilize a subset of the retinal ganglion cells (RGCs), the ipRGCs. Located in the ganglion cell layer of the retina, the ipRGCs contain a photopigment called melanopsin (Opn4). Melanopsin was originally discovered as a G Protein-Coupled Receptor (GPCR) by Ignacio Provencio and colleagues in Xenopus laevis (the African clawed frog) in 1998 and later in humans in 2000. It is currently thought that these melanopsin-expressing ipRGCs (which can detect light incident upon the retina) project axons to the SCN and the OPN in order to transmit light information for photoentrainment and pupillary constriction, respectively. Additional experiments, however, showed that mice lacking melanopsin still exhibited a pupillary light response and photoentrainment. This pointed to the rods and the cones also being involved in these functions and, hence, the NIFV pathway. The updated model of the NIFV pathway thus presents the ipRGCs as the "nodes" for integrating melanopsin and rod/cone photoresponses. It is hypothesized that rod and cone photoreceptors detect light and signal this information through a multisynaptic pathway to the ipRGCs and, hence, to the brain.

=== Melanopsin (Opn4) ===
Melanopsin, the key photopigment found in the ipRGCs, closely resembles invertebrate rhodopsins. Current evidence suggests that light enters through the retina, activates melanopsin, and triggers a conformational change in this GPCR. This results in a G protein cascade and ipRGC membrane depolarization. Interestingly, this is in contrast to the hyperpolarization observed in rods and cones. Melanopsin instead functions like the photoreceptors found in invertebrate fruit flies and horseshoe crabs. For a more detailed description, the putative molecular players of the melanopsin response pathway are labelled in this diagram.

Overview of the NIFV pathway as involved in pupillary constriction.

=== Intrinsically photosensitive retinal ganglion cells (ipRGCs) ===
To test if the ipRGCs (and not just their photopigment, melanopsin) were vital to the NIFV pathway, both Ali Güler and Megumi Hatori independently ablated these cells via selective expression of diphtheria toxin (aDTA) in a mouse model. This resulted in a reduced number of ipRGCs in the animal's retina. Overall, although IFV appeared to be unaffected, the mutant mice (with low levels of ipRGCs) performed poorly in various tests for NIFV functions (i.e. pupillary light reflexes and circadian entrainment). These results supported the ipRGCs as being the principal type of ganglion cell involved in the NIFV pathway.

Overall, the current model of NIFV postulates that the ipRGCs will become excited by light, depolarize, and release both glutamate and pituitary adenylate cyclase activating polypeptide (PACAP). These neurotransmitters can then bind to their respective receptors in the SCN. The ipRGCs also have axons innervating other regions of the brain, including the OPN (for pupillary constriction) and the dorsal lateral geniculate nucleus (dLGN, for visual perception). Further studies have indicated there to be multiple populations of morphologically distinct ipRGCs, as well. In the mouse, 6 different types (called M1-M6) have been discovered.

== Function ==
The ipRGCs integrate light signals and project axons to non-visual brain regions, primarily the SCN and the OPN. As previously mentioned, these pathways play a role in a variety of NIFV functions such as circadian photoentrainment, pupillary light reflexes, melatonin suppression and sleep-wake regulation.

=== Circadian photoentrainment ===
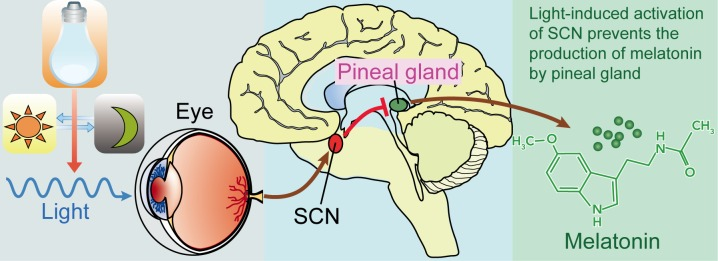
Light incident on the retina involved in photoentrainment (SCN) and melatonin suppression (pineal gland).

Through the NIFV pathway, light detected by the ipRGCs plays an important role in photoentrainment. Photoentrainment refers to the synchronization of the body's internal circadian rhythms with the external environment. As outlined above, the ipRGCs send photic signals to the SCN (the central mammalian circadian clock). This was discovered when mice lacking both rods and cones were observed to still entrain to light-dark cycles. The discovery of the ipRGCs, which express melanopsin, provided further support for this, as these cells were shown to both respond to light and innervate the SCN. Additional studies (by Güler and Hatori) then demonstrated that in the absence of the ipRGCs, photoentrainment was severely impaired. Once again, this suggested that that the ipRGCs and, hence, the NIFV pathway were critical for this function.

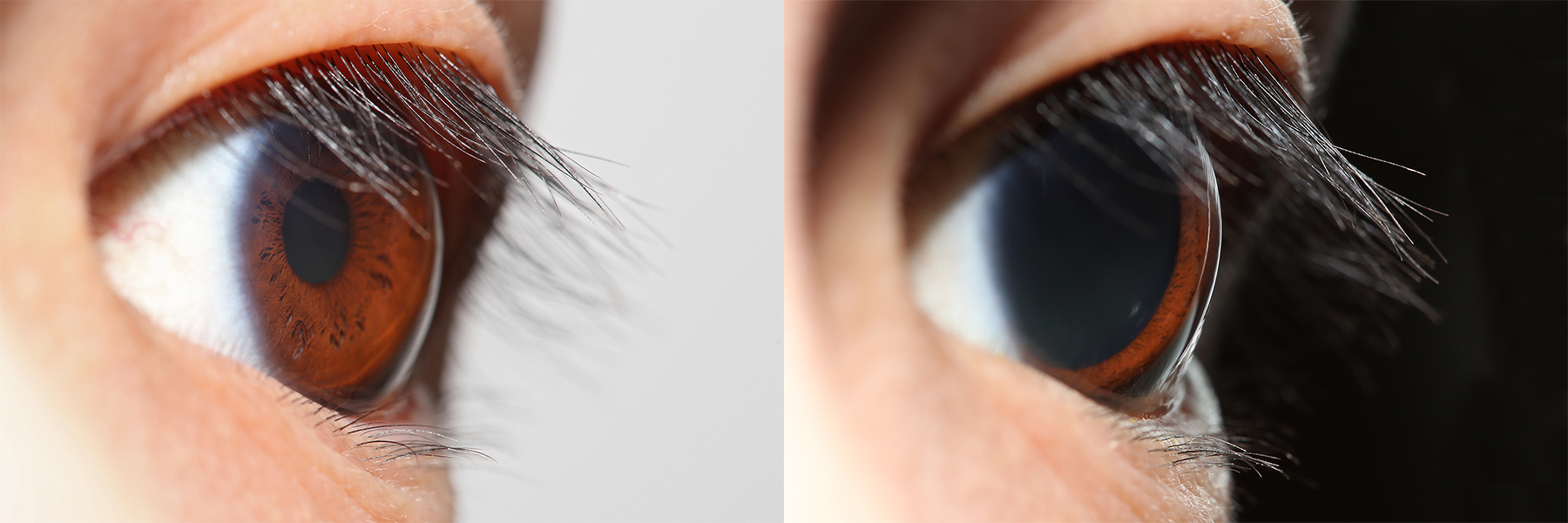
The pupillary light reflex as exhibited in well-lit (left) and dimly-lit (right) conditions.

=== Pupillary light reflexes ===
The ipRGCs also play an important role in the pupillary light reflex (PLR), which regulates pupil size in response to ambient light levels. As previously mentioned, the ipRGCs project to the OPN, which controls the constriction of the iris. A 2003 study by Robert J. Lucas and colleagues showed that the absence of melanopsin in mice leads to normal PLR when the animals are exposed to dim or moderate light but diminished responses when the animals are exposed to bright light conditions. This indicated that the ipRGCs are necessary for the normal PLR in bright light.

=== Melatonin suppression ===
Light exposure at night suppresses the production of melatonin, a hormone secreted by the pineal gland that helps to regulate circadian rhythms. Studies have shown that exposure to bright light at night significantly reduces melatonin levels. Later studies showed that even some blind individuals exhibit melatonin suppression in response to bright light. This provided evidence that light-induced melatonin regulation does not require IFV and is instead regulated by pathways involving NIFV.

=== Sleep-wake regulation ===
The ipRGCs also play a role in regulating sleep and wakefulness. In 2008, a study by Daniela Lupi and colleagues found photic regulation in mice to be primarily mediated by ipRGCs. Typically, in nocturnal rodents, light induces sleep. However, this effect is significantly reduced in mice lacking melanopsin. These results suggested that the ipRGCs (through the NIFV pathway) assist in the regulation of the mammalian sleep-wake cycle.

== Clinical implications ==
The discovery of NIFV has led to many changes in how scientific and medical communities understand, investigate, and treat relevant pathologies. Current research has found many connections between NIFV and human pathology/physiology through the pupillary light response, seasonal affective disorder (SAD), glaucoma, inherited mitochondrial optic neuropathy, sleep dysregulation with aging, migraines, neonatal light avoidance, and prenatal ocular development.

=== Pupillary light response ===
The pupillary light response is a common diagnostic procedure performed by physicians to assess the pupillary light reflex (PLR), as abnormalities of the PLR can be indicative of neurological issues. In the PLR, the pupils will dilate and constrict to regulate the intensity of light entering the eye. More specifically, as light intensity decreases, the pupils will dilate and let more light into the retina.

In 1927, Dr. Clyde E. Keeler's research team at Harvard University discovered the PLR to persist in visually blind mice (lacking rods and cones). In 1999, Dr. Robert J. Lucas's team at the Imperial College School of Medicine then confirmed Keeler's research (using mice with rod and cone double-knockouts). Later on, additional experiments also found ipRGC deficient mice to show no PLR at high light intensities, despite these animals having an otherwise competent visual system. Therefore, researchers have now suggested the rods and cones to be responsible for the PLR under low (scotopic) and moderate (mesopic) light conditions and the ipRGCs to be responsible under high (photopic) light conditions.

=== Seasonal affective disorder ===
Seasonal Affective Disorder (SAD), a depressive disorder that affects 5% of the US population, is related to the light variation that comes with seasonal changes. In a patient suffering from SAD, depressive symptoms will typically begin in late fall or early winter (when ambient light levels decrease). Currently, NIFV is suspected to play a role in SAD and is a focus of various research studies. The 2014 study by Kathryn Roecklein, Patricia Wong, Megan Miller, Shannon Donofry, Marissa Kamarck and George Brainard, for example, explored how melanopsin gene variations in two populations were associated with SAD. It is thus hypothesized that NIFV may be linked to SAD through changes in activity and sleep timing in the winter.

=== Glaucoma ===
Glaucoma, a group of eye diseases that commonly appear in older adults, involves damage (most commonly intraocular hypertension) to the optic nerve and/or impairment to the neuronal visual pathway. Initial research using rat models has demonstrated that rats suffering from glaucoma have significantly reduced cone and melanopsin mRNA. This has suggested a potential role of NIFV in Glaucoma.

Additional studies have found patients with glaucoma to have a less sustained PLR under high intensity light when compared to healthy controls. Given the previously-described role of the ipRGCs in the high-light-induced PLR, these results have indicated a decreased response of the ipRGCs in patients with glaucoma. Polysomnography measurements have also suggested a general decrease in sleep quality for those same patients. More specifically, these patients were found to have more daytime sleepiness per the Epworth Sleepiness Scale. Currently, to decipher the role of NIFV in glaucoma, research (using ipRGC knockout rat models) is ongoing.

=== Inherited mitochondrial optic neuropathy ===
Inherited mitochondrial optic neuropathies, including Leber's hereditary optic neuropathy (LHON) and dominant optic atrophy (DOA), result in vision loss starting in young adulthood. This is thought to be caused by mitochondrial dysfunction leading to selective RGC (and RGC axon) loss. Yet, many patients with these conditions typically display relatively normal PLRs; in other words, the ipRGCs are typically preserved. Currently, the reason for this sparing mechanism is unknown but some researchers speculate that this points to the ipRGCs of the NIFV pathway being more "metabolically robust" than other RGCs.

=== Sleep dysregulation with aging ===
RGC loss with aging has been observed in various animal studies. Additionally, sleep changes with aging (lesser non-REM sleep and increased awakening in older age) have also been noted. These two concepts have now been connected via the study of Christian Cajochen, Mirjam Münch, Vera Knoblauch, Katherina Blatter and Anna Werz-Justice. This 2009 study detailed a decline in circadian rhythm regulation with age. More specifically, circadian phase markers such as core body temperature, melatonin, and cortisol secretion were seen to decline.

=== Photophobia in migraine ===
Clinical observations suggest blind patients with intact light perception to suffer from intensified photophobia (sensitivity to light) and migraine exacerbation compared to their enucleated counterparts. Recently (in 2002 and in 2006), using rat models, the ipRGCs have been implicated in this pathway. Although no statistically significant differences in the severity or frequency of human migraines following ipRGC stimulation has been observed, it is still possible that the NIFV system may play a role in this condition.

=== Neonatal light avoidance and prenatal ocular development ===
Recent studies have revealed that the NIFV system begins developing earlier than previously understood, with important implications for both behavior (neonatal light avoidance) and physiology (prenatal ocular development).

In both humans and rodents, melanopsin has been shown to be expressed during gestation (in the prenatal period). This suggests that the ipRGC-mediated response may play a critical role even before traditional IFV becomes active. Although research regarding the function of NIFV in-utero is still ongoing, a 2010 study by Juliette Johnson and colleagues has now shown newborn (neonatal) mice lacking rods and cones to still turn away in response to the application of bright light as an aversive stimulus. This behavior is thought to help neonates seek shelter in dark environments, such as when returning to the nest. Later on, in 2013, a study by Sujata Rao and colleagues then demonstrated the role of the ipRGCs in the formation of the ocular hyaloid vasculature (a network of blood vessels in the developing eye of the fetus). More specifically, mice either lacking melanopsin or reared in constant darkness were both seen to have abnormal fetal hyaloid vasculature structures. Thus, it is currently thought that light signaling through melanopsin in the NIFV system not only plays a role in early-life behaviors such as neonatal light avoidance but, also, in normal ocular development.
