= Light effects on circadian rhythm =

Light effects on circadian rhythm are the response of circadian rhythms to light.

Most human beings, animals and other living organisms have a biological clock that synchronizes their physiology and behaviour with the daily changes in the environment. The physiological changes that follow these clocks are known as circadian rhythms. Because the endogenous period of these rhythms is approximately 24 hours, these rhythms must be reset by external cues to synchronize with the daily cycles in the environment. This process is called entrainment. One of the most important cues to entrain circadian rhythms is light.

== Mechanism ==
Light first passes into a mammal's circadian system through the retina, then takes one of two paths: the light gets collected by rod cells and cone cells that project to a small number of the retinal ganglion cells (RGCs) that are also intrinsically light sensitive.

The RGCs use the photopigment melanopsin to absorb the light energy. Specifically, this class of RGCs being discussed is referred to as "intrinsically photosensitive", which just means they are sensitive to light. There are five known types of intrinsically photosensitive retinal ganglion cells (ipRGCs): M1, M2, M3, M4, and M5. Each of these different ipRGC types have different melanopsin content and photosensitivity. These connect to amacrine cells in the inner plexiform layer of the retina. Ultimately, via this retinohypothalamic tract (RHT) the suprachiasmatic nucleus (SCN) of the hypothalamus receives light information from these ipRGCs.

The ipRGCs serve a different function than rods and cones, even when isolated from the other components of the retina, ipRGCs maintain their photo-sensitivity and as a result can be sensitive to different ranges of the light spectrum. Additionally, ipRGC firing patterns may respond to light conditions as low as 1 lux whereas previous research indicated 2500 lux was required to suppress melatonin production. Circadian and other behavioral responses have been shown to be more sensitive at lower wavelengths than the photopic luminous efficiency function that is based on sensitivity to cone receptors.

The core region of the SCN houses the majority of light-sensitive neurons. From here, signals are transmitted via a nerve connection with the pineal gland that regulates various hormones in the human body.

There are specific genes that determine the regulation of circadian rhythm in conjunction with light. When light activates NMDA receptors in the SCN, CLOCK gene expression in that region is altered and the SCN is reset, and this is how entrainment occurs. Genes also involved with entrainment are PER1 and PER2.

Some important structures directly impacted by the light–sleep relationship are the superior colliculus-pretectal area and the ventrolateral pre-optic nucleus.

The progressive yellowing of the crystalline lens with age reduces the amount of short-wavelength light reaching the retina and may contribute to circadian alterations observed in older adulthood.

== Effects ==
=== Primary ===
All of the mechanisms of light-affected entrainment are not yet fully known, however numerous studies have demonstrated the effectiveness of light entrainment to the day/night cycle. Studies have shown that the timing of exposure to light influences entrainment; as seen on the phase response curve for light for a given species. In diurnal (day-active) species, exposure to light soon after wakening advances the circadian rhythm, whereas exposure before sleeping delays the rhythm. An advance means that the individual will tend to wake up earlier on the following day(s). A delay, caused by light exposure before sleeping, means that the individual will tend to wake up later on the following day(s).

The hormones cortisol and melatonin, known as the "sleep hormone", are affected by the signals light sends through the body's nervous system. These hormones help regulate blood sugar to give the body the appropriate amount of energy that is required throughout the day. Cortisol levels are high upon waking and gradually decrease over the course of the day, melatonin levels are high when the body is entering and exiting a sleeping status and are very low over the course of waking hours. The earth's natural light-dark cycle is the basis for the release of these hormones.

The length of light exposure influences entrainment. Longer exposures have a greater effect than shorter exposures. Consistent light exposure has a greater effect than intermittent exposure. In rats, constant light eventually disrupts the cycle to the point that memory and stress coping may be impaired.

The intensity and the wavelength of light influence entrainment. Dim light can affect entrainment relative to darkness. Brighter light is more effective than dim light. In humans, a lower intensity short wavelength (blue/violet) light appears to be equally effective as a higher intensity of white light.

Exposure to monochromatic light at the wavelengths of 460 nm and 550 nm on two control groups yielded results showing decreased sleepiness at 460 nm tested over two groups and a control group. Additionally, in the same study but testing thermoregulation and heart rate researchers found significantly increased heart rate in 460 nm light over the course of a 1.5-hour exposure period.

In a study done on the effect of lighting intensity on delta waves, a measure of sleepiness, high levels of lighting (1700 lux) showed lower levels of delta waves measured through an EEG than low levels of lighting (450 lux). This shows that lighting intensity is directly correlated with alertness in an office environment.

Humans are sensitive to light with a short wavelength. Specifically, melanopsin is sensitive to blue light with a wavelength of approximately 480 nm. The effect this wavelength of light has on melanopsin leads to physiological responses such as the suppression of melatonin production, increased alertness, and alterations to the circadian rhythm.

=== Secondary ===
While light has direct effects on circadian rhythm, there are indirect effects seen across studies. Seasonal affective disorder creates a model in which decreased day length during autumn and winter increases depressive symptoms. A shift in the circadian phase response curve creates a connection between the amount of light in a day (day length) and depressive symptoms in this disorder. Light seems to have therapeutic antidepressant effects when an organism is exposed to it at appropriate times during the circadian rhythm, regulating the sleep-wake cycle.

In addition to mood, learning and memory become impaired when the circadian system shifts due to light stimuli, which can be seen in studies modeling jet lag and shift work situations. Frontal and parietal lobe areas involved in working memory have been implicated in melanopsin responses to light information.

"In 2007, the International Agency for Research on Cancer classified shift work with circadian disruption or chronodisruption as a probable human carcinogen."

Exposure to light during the hours of melatonin production reduces melatonin production. Melatonin has been shown to mitigate the growth of tumors in rats. By suppressing the production of melatonin over the course of the night rats showed increased rates of tumors over the course of a four-week period.

Artificial light at night causing circadian disruption additionally impacts sex steroid production. Increased levels of progestogens and androgens were found in night shift workers as compared to "working hour" workers.

The proper exposure to light has become an accepted way to alleviate some of the effects of seasonal affective disorder (SAD). In addition, exposure to light in the morning has been shown to assist Alzheimer patients in regulating their waking patterns.

In response to light exposure, alertness levels can increase as a result of suppression of melatonin secretion. A linear relationship has been found between alerting effects of light and activation in the posterior hypothalamus.

Disruption of circadian rhythm as a result of light also produces changes in metabolism.

Modern Impacts of Artificial Lighting

Artificial light exposure at night, especially from electronic devices like smartphones, tablets, and LED lighting, significantly impacts circadian rhythms. Short-wavelength blue light suppresses melatonin secretion, a hormone regulating sleep-wake cycles, resulting in delayed sleep onset and reduced sleep quality. Studies indicate that nighttime light exposure disrupts circadian timing and negatively affects mood, cognitive performance, and metabolic health. Conversely, exposure to natural daylight in the morning synchronizes the circadian clock, enhancing alertness, sleep quality, and overall well-being. Disruptions to circadian rhythms due to irregular light exposure are linked to increased risks of sleep disorders, depression, obesity, and cardiovascular disease.

Exposure to artificial light during sleep, even at low levels, can disrupt circadian rhythms and alter brain function. Research suggests that nighttime light exposure affects neural pathways involved in mood regulation, sleep, and hormonal balance. Chronic exposure to dim light has been linked to depressive-like behavior and impaired recovery from stress-related physiological conditions. These findings indicate that circadian disruption is not limited to sleep disturbances but may also contribute to broader mental and neurological health effects, including mood disorders and reduced cognitive performance.

== Measured lighting for rating systems ==
=== Melanopic lux ===
Light is a type of power that can be measured in watts. It is also an object of human perception, and for the normal photopic vision (cone cells) there is a conversion from watts to lumens based on how the watts are divided among wavelengths called a luminous efficiency function. From lumens we derive the typical units of luminous intensity (candelas = lumen/steradian), luminance (candelas/m^{2}) and illuminance (lux = lumen/m^{2}). But as mentioned before, the human circadian system is not mainly fed by cone cells, but by ipRGC cells having a different kind of opsin protein (melanopsin). As a result, cone-based units do not perfectly reflect the effects of light on the human body.

The wavelength sensitivities of melanopsin has been measured. This allows researchers to define a separate luminous efficiency function around it (while taking into account light absorption by other parts of the eye), and as a result a separate set of "melanopic" luminous measures. The most important of them all is the melanopic lux, the measurement of illuminance (how much light is hitting a unit area) for circadian purposes.

The melanopic lux can be calculated, like the regular lux, from a spectral power distribution (SPD) of the light source. This is the preferred and more accurate way of measuring the melanopic lux. Because it also takes the SPD to measure the regular (photopic) lux, existing lux-measuring devices can be provided with a software change to also calculate the melanopic version. (The more up-to-date standard is the M-EDI, melanopic equivalent daylight illuminance, which describes how much of D65 sunlight would have the same effect on the circadian rhythm. 1 melanopic lux = 0.9058 M-EDI lux.)

However, most existing publications from papers to device datasheets only provide values in photopic units (lumens, lux) and not the complete SPD. A rough conversion to the melanopic lux can still be performed if the type of light source is known, as each type has a characteristic shape to its SPD. From this characteristic shape one can estimate a conversion ratio between photopic and melanopic units for this specific class of light source, achieving conversion. For example:

Example conversions from lux to melanopic lux
Light source	CCT (K)	SPD profile	Photopic lux	Melanopic lux	Conversion factor	M-EDI lux	Method
Daylight	6504	D65	1000	1104.00	1.10400	1000	From M-EDI definition
White LED	4730	Nonstandard	1000	790.22	0.79022	715.78	Lucas 2014 Toolbox
Cool white LED	9500	Nonstandard	406	528.50	1.30172	478.72	Lucas 2014 example
Incandescent	2856	A	1000	547.28	0.54728	495.73	Lucas 2014 example
Fluorescent	4000	F11	1000	621.55	0.62155	562.95	Lucas 2014 example

Animals have slightly different photopic and melanopic curves, but there is a similar gap between the two. As a result, animal experiments on the circadian rhythm also need to be reinterpreted similarly.

=== Reference amounts ===
==== WELL ====
The WELL Building standard was designed for "advancing health and well-being in buildings globally". Part of the standard is the implementation of Credit 54: Circadian Lighting Design. Specific thresholds for different office areas are designated in order to achieve credits. Light is measured at 1.2 m above the finished floor for all areas.

- Work areas must have at least a value of 200 equivalent melanopic lux present for 75% or more work stations between the hours of 09:00 and 13:00 for each day of the year when daylight is incorporated into calculations. If daylight is not taken into account all workstations require lighting at the value of 150 equivalent melanopic lux or greater.
- Living environments, which are bedrooms, bathrooms and rooms with windows, at least one fixture must provide a melanopic lux value of at least 200 during the day and a melanopic lux value less than 50 during the night, measured 0.76 m above the finished floor.
- Breakrooms require an average melanopic lux of 250.
- Learning areas require either that light models which may incorporate daylighting have an equivalent melanopic lux of 125 for at least 75% of desks for at least four hours per day or that ambient lights maintain the standard lux recommendations set forth by Table 3 of the IES-ANSI RP-3-13.

The WELL Building standard additionally provides direction for circadian emulation in multi-family residences. In order to more accurately replicate natural cycles lighting users must be able to set a wake and bed time.

- An equivalent melanopic lux of 250 must be maintained in the period of the day between the indicated wake time and two hours before the indicated bed time.
- An equivalent melanopic lux of 50 or less is required for the period of the day spanning from two hours before the indicated bed time through the wake time.
- At the indicated wake time melanopic lux should increase from 0 to 250 over the course of at least 15 minutes.

== Other factors ==
Although many researchers consider light to be the strongest cue for entrainment, it is not the only factor acting on circadian rhythms. Other factors may enhance or decrease the effectiveness of entrainment. For instance, exercise and other physical activity, when coupled with light exposure, result in a somewhat stronger entrainment response. Other factors such as music and properly timed administration of the neurohormone melatonin have shown similar effects. Numerous other factors affect entrainment as well. These include feeding schedules, temperature, pharmacology, locomotor stimuli, social interaction, sexual stimuli and stress.

Circadian-based effects have also been found on visual perception to discomfort glare. The time of day at which people are shown a light source that produces visual discomfort is not perceived evenly. As the day progresses, people tend to become more tolerant to the same levels of discomfort glare (i.e., people are more sensitive to discomfort glare in the morning compared to later in the day.) Further studies on chronotype show that early chronotypes can also tolerate more discomfort glare in the morning compared to late chronotypes.

== See also ==
- Chronobiology
- Circadian advantage
- Circadian clock
- Circadian oscillator
- Circadian rhythm disorders
- Electronic media and sleep
- Light therapy
- Scotobiology
