= Arnold Eskin =

American chronobiologist (died 2019)

- Born: November 8, 1940
- Died: December 22, 2019 (aged 79)
- Education: Vanderbilt University; University of Texas at Austin
- Known for: Neuroscience; Circadian Rhythms; the Eskinogram
- Scientific career
- Fields: Chronobiology, neurobiology
- Website: www.bchs.uh.edu/people/detail/?155622-961-5=aeskin#info_research

Arnold Eskin was a professor of chronobiology at the University of Houston in Houston, Texas. He attended Vanderbilt University, where he received a degree in physics. He later attended University of Texas at Austin, where he received his Ph.D. in zoology in 1969. He is credited with the formulation of the Eskinogram, a schematic representation of circadian clocks, and has been a leader in the discovery of mechanisms underlying entrainment of circadian clocks.

== Research ==
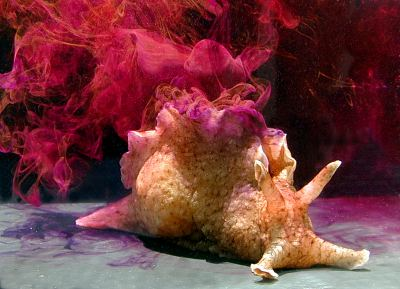
Aplysia californica

=== Menaker lab ===
In his early scientific career, Eskin studied circadian rhythms in the house sparrow, while working in chronobiologist Michael Menaker's lab at the University of Texas at Austin.

Eskin's most cited paper while in Menaker's lab concerns his research of non-ocular entraining cues in house sparrows. In it, Eskin and Menaker showed the scientific community the ability of house sparrows to entrain to auditory cues as opposed to previously shown light cues.

=== Ongoing research ===
Eskin's current research focuses on long-term memory formation. His lab focuses on the role of the circadian clock and the regulation of glutamate uptake in synaptic plasticity, using aplysia and rats as model organisms primarily.

==== Role of glutamate transporters in memory formation ====
Eskin's lab has extensively studied the role of glutamate transporters in synaptic plasticity in aplysia. Specifically, his group has shown that glutamate uptake increases during long-term sensitization in Aplysia, long-term potentiation (LTP) in the hippocampus of rats, and morphine addiction and withdrawal in rats. Deficiencies in glutamate uptake during changes in synaptic efficacy have also been linked to diseases such as Amyotrophic lateral sclerosis (ALS), Alzheimer's disease, and Epilepsy. Blockage of NMDA receptors prevents glutamate from binding, which prevents the formation of long-term memory. Eskin's group believes that the mechanism for glutamate uptake is phylogenetically conserved for multiple types of synaptic plasticity. They currently study the mechanism by which this process takes place.

==== Role of circadian clocks in memory formation ====
Eskin has also researched the role of the circadian clock in glutaminergic synaptic plasticity. Although it was known that the brain's circadian clock could influence physiological outputs such as sleep and wakefulness, metabolic rate, and body temperature, Eskin suggested that the circadian clock may play another role as a regulator for memory formation. He and his lab have shown that an aplysia's ability to form long-term memory is dependent on the time of day, namely that aplysia are able to form long-term memories during the day, but are unable to at night. This was done via regulation of several factors, including neurotransmitter release, MAPK signaling, and immediate early gene expression. Short-term memory, however, has not been shown to vary based on time of day. The mechanism by which this occurs is not currently understood, but Eskin and his lab have continued to study the circadian characteristics of glutamate uptake in synaptic plasticity in order to learn more about the mechanism by which memory formation is controlled by a circadian clock. Furthermore, such information will be useful for chronobiology as a whole in helping explain how a biological clock regulates its outputs to produce rhythm.

== Eskinogram ==
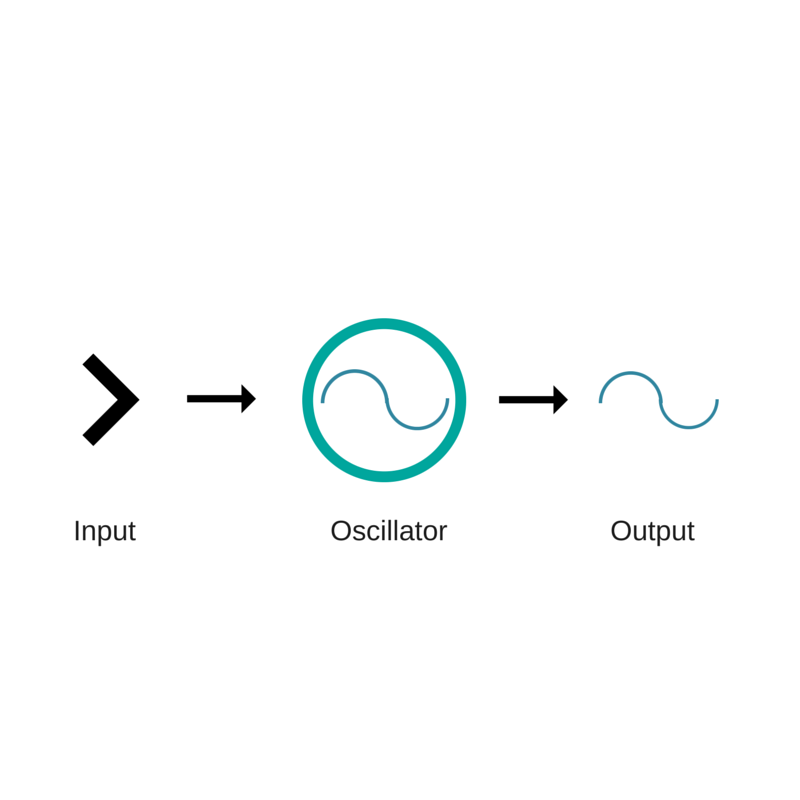
The three components of an Eskinogram: Input, Oscillator, and Output.

Eskin developed the Eskinogram as a heuristic that provides a mechanism for understanding circadian clock pathways. It presents a clock pathway as having three components: input, oscillator, and output. Further modifications to this core model can be made for more complex systems. For example, one oscillator may be able to control multiple outputs.

=== Model use ===
The Eskinogram has notably been used to model how the suprachiasmatic nucleus (SCN) acts as a master oscillator for the human biological clock. A group of photoreceptors called the intrinsically photosensitive retinal ganglion cells (ipRGCs) act as the input for the clock mechanism. These cells then use a pathway dependent on melanopsin to signal to the SCN. The SCN then uses a transcription-translation feedback loop, consisting of a set of clock genes that regulate their own expression, to act as a complete oscillator and signal locomotor outputs accordingly.

=== Impact ===
The Eskinogram is regarded as a central dogma for circadian researchers. This has led to Eskin's work being influential to later researchers in chronobiology. For example, Eskin worked closely with Dr. Samer Hattar on his thesis on circadian rhythms.

== Awards and honors ==
For his contributions to the Department of Biology and Biochemistry, Eskin received the 25th Esther Farfel Award from the University of Houston in 2003. Serving as department chair from 1994 to 2000, he established a focus on research in neuroscience, biological clocks, and infectious disease and tripled research grants to the department. In the same year, Eskin also received the John and Rebecca Moores Professors Award from the University of Houston.
