= Russell Foster =

British neuroscientist (born 1959)

Russell Foster CBE FRS FMedSci
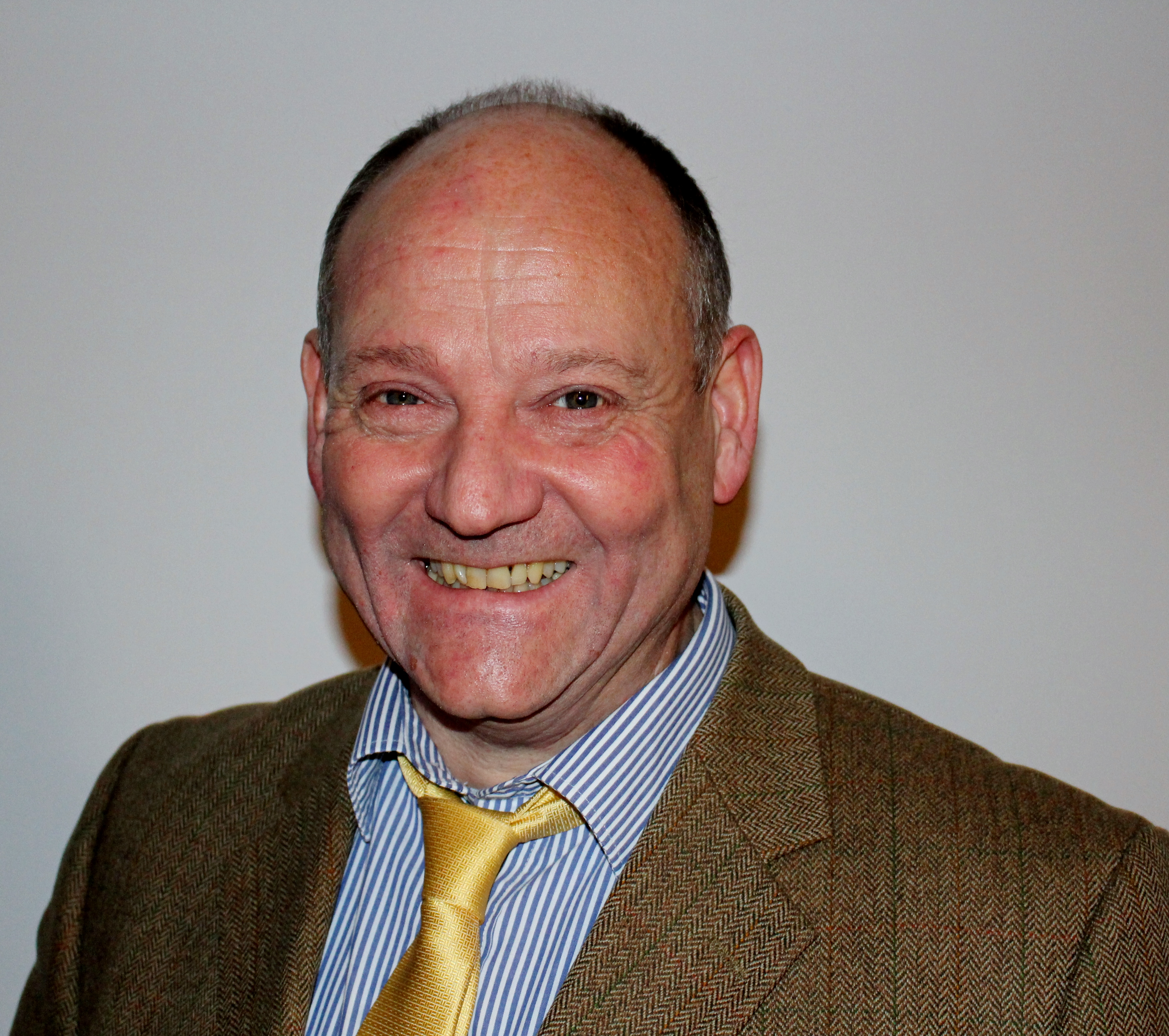
- Russell Foster in 2014
- Born: Russell Grant Foster; 19 August 1959 (age 67); Aldershot, Hampshire, England
- Education: University of Bristol
- Awards: The Daylight Award (2020)
- Scientific career
- Fields: Neuroscience
- Workplaces: University of Virginia; Imperial College London; University of Oxford
- Thesis: An investigation of the extraretinal photoreceptors mediating photoperiodic induction in the Japanese quail (Coturnix coturnix japonica) (1983)
- Academic advisors: Brian Follett
- Website: www.ndcn.ox.ac.uk/team/russell-foster

Russell Grant Foster (born 1959) is a British professor of circadian neuroscience, the Director of the Nuffield Laboratory of Ophthalmology and the Head of the Sleep and Circadian Neuroscience Institute (SCNi) at the University of Oxford He is also a Nicholas Kurti Senior Fellow at Brasenose College, Oxford. Foster and his group are credited with key contributions to the discovery of the non-rod, non-cone, photosensitive retinal ganglion cells (pRGCs) in the mammalian retina which provide input to the circadian rhythm system. He has written and co-authored over a hundred scientific publications.

Since 2018 he has served as Editor-in-Chief of the Royal Society journal Interface Focus.

== Education ==
Foster was born in Aldershot. He was educated at Heron Wood School and Farnborough Sixth Form College. In 1980, he was awarded a Bachelor of Science (BSc) degree in Zoology followed by PhD in 1983, both from the University of Bristol. His thesis on extraretinal photoreceptor cells was supervised by Brian Follett.

== Career and research ==
From 1988 to 1995 Foster was a member of the National Science Foundation (NSF) Center for Biological Rhythms at the University of Virginia, where he worked closely with Michael Menaker. In 1995, he returned to UK and started his own lab at Imperial College London, where he became Chair of Molecular Neuroscience within the Faculty of Medicine. He later transferred his laboratory to the University of Oxford to engage in more translational research.

=== Transplanted suprachiasmatic nucleus determines circadian period ===
While at the University of Virginia, Foster and Menaker performed experiments where the suprachiasmatic nucleus (SCN) was tested by neural transplantation of donor's SCN to a recipient with an ablated SCN. In the experiment, the donor was a mutant strain of hamster with a shortened circadian period. The recipient was a wild-type hamster. Transplantation was done the other way around as well, with wild-type hamster as the donor and mutant strain hamster as the recipient. After the transplantation, the formerly wild-type hamster displayed a shortened period which resembled the mutant, and the mutant-strain hamster showed normal period. The SCN restored rhythm to arrhythmic recipients, which afterwards always exhibited the circadian period of the donor. This result led to the conclusion that the SCN is sufficient and necessary for mammalian circadian rhythms.

=== Rods and cones unnecessary for entrainment ===
In 1991, Foster and his colleagues provided evidence that rods and cones are not necessary for entrainment of an animal to light. In this experiment, Foster gave light pulses to retinally degenerative mice. These mice were homozygous for the rd allele and were shown to have no rods in their retina. Only a few cones were found to remain in the retina. To study the effects of light entrainment, magnitude of phase shift of locomotor activity was measured. The results showed that both mice with normal retina and mice with degenerate retina showed similar entrainment patterns. Foster hypothesized that circadian photoreception occurs with a small number of cones without an outer layer or that an unrecognised class of photoreceptive cells are present.

In 1999, Foster studied light entrainment on mice without cones or both rods and cones. Mice without cones or without both photoreceptive cells (rd/rd cl allele) still entrained to light. Meanwhile, mice with eyes removed could not entrain to light. Foster concluded that rods and cones are unnecessary for entrainment to light, and that the murine eye contains additional photoreceptive cell types. Later studies showed that melanopsin expressing photoreceptive retinal ganglion cells (pGRCs) were accountable for non-rod, non-cone entrainment to light.

=== Popular science ===
Foster is the co-author with writer and broadcaster Leon Kreitzman of two popular science books on circadian rhythms, Rhythms of Life: The Biological Clocks that Control the Daily Lives of Every Living Thing and Seasons of Life: The Biological Rhythms That Enable Living Things to Thrive and Survive. He has also co-written a book titled Sleep: a Very Short Introduction. He wrote Life Time : The New Science of the Body Clock, and How It Can Revolutionize Your Sleep and Health.

=== Awards and honours ===
Foster was elected a Fellow of the Royal Society (FRS) in 2008 and a Fellow of the Academy of Medical Sciences (FMedSci) in 2013.

Foster was appointed Commander of the Order of the British Empire (CBE) in the 2015 New Year Honours for services to science.

Foster has received international recognition for his contributions to the discovery of photosensitive ganglion cells include:

- Honma Prize (Japan, 1997)
- David G. Cogan Award (USA, 2001)
- Zoological Society of London Scientific Medal (UK, 2000)
- Edridge Green Medal (Royal College of Ophthalmologists, UK, 2005)
- Peter C. Farrell Prize in Sleep Medicine (2015)
- Nikken International Science Award for his expertise in the neuroscience of sleep.(2015)
- The Daylight Award 2020, for Daylight Research
