= Robert Y. Moore =

American neurologist

Robert Y. Moore (born December 5, 1931) is an American neurologist with interests in disorders of biological rhythms, movement disorders, and behavioral neurology. He is credited with discovering the function of the suprachiasmatic nucleus (SCN) as the circadian clock, as well as, describing its organization. He is also credited with establishing the role of the mammalian retinohypothalamic tract (RHT) as a photic entrainment pathway. Moore cin 2017 serves as a professor of neurology, with a secondary in psychiatry and neuroscience at the University of Pittsburgh, and as co-director of the National Parkinson Foundation Center of Excellence at the University of Pittsburgh.

== Early life and education ==
Robert Moore was born in Harvey, Illinois on December 5, 1931. At the age of 5, his family moved to Atlanta where Moore was forced to repeat Kindergarten after initially failing. The Moore family then moved to Detroit, Michigan where as a 2nd and 3rd grader, Moore developed a love of reading thanks to his father’s gift of Tom Sawyer and Huckleberry Finn. In 1938, Moore’s younger brother was born. In 1939, the Moore family moved to St. Louis, Missouri. The family moved back to Chicago in 1942. Moore’s poor school performance was repeated as he failed all classes in the eighth grade. However, after performing well on a school-issued IQ exam, Moore was accelerated into high school at the urging of his principal. After two years of continued poor marks, Moore’s grades improved markedly and he received high grades for the remainder of his academic career.

=== College education ===
After completion of high school, Moore initially began his college studies at Kenyon College, an all men’s school in Gambier, Ohio. He soon transferred to Lawrence University in Appleton, Wisconsin where he received his B.A. in 1953. It was during this time that Moore met John Bucklew, a professor and the university that became Moore’s mentor. From this mentorship, Moore developed a lasting fascination with the brain, specifically, localization of function within the brain, that would go on to impact the rest of his career.

Moore continued his education through completion of his MD and Ph.D. degree at the University of Chicago in 1957 and 1963 respectively. His Ph.D. thesis was based conceptually on prior work that had determined that bilateral legions in the hippocampus of humans resulted in short-term memory loss. Moore's thesis tested the hypothesis that animals with similar hippocampal lesions would suffer a similar decrease in memory function, thus, an animal model for memory research could be used. Despite failing to yield positive results, Moore cited his thesis work as having played an integral role in the development of his passion for research. During his senior year, Moore worked as a graduate assistant in the neuroanatomy course, giving several lectures and unearthing a love for teaching. After his postdoctoral year, Moore completed a rotating internship with a focus on neurology at the University of Michigan. While there, Moore met Douglas Buchana, one of the founder of child neurology, and was greatly inspired by his teachings. Moore found another role model in Richard B. Richter, the chief of neurology at the University of Chicago where Moore would complete his residency training in neurology in 1963 while simultaneously operating a neurology laboratory. Moore’s combined passions of research, teaching, and clinical medicine, would continue to influence his career through various awards and faculty positions.

== Career ==
=== Discovery of suprachiasmatic nucleus as the master circadian clock ===
In 1972 in his laboratory at the University of Chicago, Moore and Victor B. Eichler demonstrated the suprachiasmatic nucleus (SCN), a small region of the brain in the hypothalamus located directly above the optic chiasm, was necessary for circadian rhythms, i.e. it was a circadian clock. While the SCN had been a known component of the brain for nearly one hundred years, previously, its function had been unknown. After being limited in his research of the RHT by the technology at the time, Moore decided to test the SCN’s role in circadian rhythms by using a biochemical assay to show the effects of SCN ablation on corticosterone rhythms. He conducted an experiment using rats in which he established several control groups and a test group. Using a Halasz knife and his microsurgery experience gained in prior laboratory work, Moore lesioned the SCN of the mice in the test group. The resulting arrhythmicity in corticosterone levels in these mice compared to the control group’s maintained rhythmicity, revealed the SCN’s function as the master circadian clock. This experiment laid the foundation for numerous other studies into better understanding the role of the SCN in mammalian circadian functions.

=== Organization of the suprachiasmatic nucleus ===
Through his work circa 1988, Moore developed an organizational model for the SCN in all mammals. His design described two anatomically and functionally distinct subdivisions called the core and shell. This was determined by a comparative anatomy of the SCN in a mouse, guinea pig, cat, and opossum with immunohistochemistry studies that identified segregation of afferents and distinct neuropeptides between the core and shell. The core is a division lying above the optic chiasm composed of vasoactive intestinal polypeptide (VIP)-producing neurons that receive RHT and secondary visual inputs. The shell surrounds the core and is composed of vasopressin-producing neurons and receives input from the hypothalamus, brainstem, and basal forebrain. These subdivisions function as individual pacemakers, and their neurochemical organization reflects intercellular communication that posit potential coupling mechanisms.

=== The Retinohypothalamic Tract: A Mammalian Photic Entrainment Pathway ===
Before Moore studied the SCN directly, he investigated the mammalian retinohypothalamic tract (RHT). Through an autoradiograph experiment in 1972, Moore and Nicholas J. Lenn, who was a graduate student at the time, found evidence for a direct retinal projection to the ventral portion of the SCN as arising from a subset of retinal ganglion cells, the RHT. This was confirmed by observing axon terminal degeneration following removal of the eye. After discovering that RHTs were a consistent feature of the mammalian visual system by studying other systems such as that of primates, he and his colleagues proceeded to conduct SCN ablation experiments. Moore noted technical limitations of the time as the reason for not continuing his study of the RHT.

Moore returned to his investigation into the role of the RHT after establishing the SCN’s role as the master circadian clock. In 1988, Moore, along with Ralph F. Johnson and Lawrence P. Morin, established the role of the RHT as a light entrainment pathway of the SCN and thus a critical element of the circadian clock. This was demonstrated through an experiment in which Moore and his colleagues performed a selective transection of the RHT in the hamster and rat. This led to a loss of photic entrainment while other visual functions were preserved.

=== Using brain imaging to visualize Parkinson's disease symptoms ===
Parkinson's disease is the current focus of Moore's research; he is considered an expert in the field.

In 2003, Moore analyzed positron emission tomography (PET) scans of the brains of 16 healthy patients and 41 patients afflicted with Parkinson's disease. The brain imaging focused primarily on two areas of the brain: the locus coeruleus, which is a nucleus in the pons responsible for responses to stress and panic, and the raphe, which is a small cluster of nuclei in the brainstem responsible for releasing serotonin. More generally, these two areas of the brain are thought to play a role in controlling wakefulness and attention. Through these brain images, Moore observed evidence suggesting a degeneration of nerve cells in these two areas. This was the first time that nerve degeneration, a hallmark of Parkinson's disease, was observed in living patients.

== Appointments and honors ==
=== Appointments ===
- Instructor in Anatomy to Professor Anatomy and Neurology, University of Chicago (1959–1974)
- Professor, Department of Neurosciences, University of California San Diego (1974–1979)
- Professor and Chair, Department of Neurology, Stony Brook University (1979–1990) Professor, Departments of Neurology and Psychiatry, University of Pittsburgh (1990–1996); Chair of Neurology (1996–2000)
- Love Family Professor of Neurology and Neuroscience, University of Pittsburgh (1998–present)

=== Honors and awards ===
- Markle Scholar in Medical Science (1964–1969)
- M.D. (Honoris causa), University of Lund, Sweden (1974)
- President, The Cajal Club (Society of Neuroanatomists) (1990–1992)
- C.U. Ariens-Kappers Medal, Netherlands Institute for Brain Research, Royal Netherlands Academy of Science (1991)
- President, Society for Research on Biological Rhythms (1992–1994)
- Farrell Prize in Sleep Medicine, Harvard Medical School (2010)
- Member, President’s Committee on the National Medal of Science (2006–2011)

== Personal life ==
Moore married his current wife, Jane DeYoung, in 1997. He has four children from previous marriages.
