= Samer Hattar =

Jordanian chronobiologist

- سامر حتر
- Born: Amman, Jordan
- Education: Yarmouk University
- Known for: Melanopsin ipRGC
- Awards: Alfred P. Sloan Research Fellow; David and Lucile Packard Foundation Fellowship for Science & Engineering; Albert Lehninger Research Award
- Scientific career
- Fields: Neuroscience; Chronobiology
- Workplaces: Johns Hopkins University; American University of Beirut; University of Houston

Samer Hattar (Arabic: سامر حتر) is a chronobiologist and a leader in the field of non-image forming photoreception. He is the Chief of the Section on Light and Circadian Rhythms at the National Institute of Mental Health, part of the National Institutes of Health. He was previously an associate professor in the Department of Neuroscience and the Department of Biology at Johns Hopkins University in Baltimore, MD. He is best known for his investigation into the role of melanopsin and intrinsically photosensitive retinal ganglion cells (ipRGC) in the entrainment of circadian rhythms.

== Life ==
Samer Hattar was born in Amman, Jordan to a Jordanian father and a Lebanese mother. Raised in a Christian family, he planned on becoming a priest. He studied at Terra Sancta High School, a Catholic high school in Amman, from 1978 to 1988. He earned good grades in his classes and fell in love with biology when introduced to Mendel's pea plant experiments. This passion inspired him to pursue a career in science. He attended Yarmouk University in Irbid for his undergraduate studies, where he majored in Biology and minored in Chemistry. His high marks earned him the honor of meeting Hassan Bin Talal, the prince of Jordan. After graduating from Yarmouk in 1991, he completed a master's degree in biochemistry at the American University of Beirut in Beirut. He began his graduate studies in biochemistry in 1993 at the University of Houston where he studied circadian regulation of a transcription factor in aplysia. Hattar completed his postdoctoral fellowship at the Solomon Snyder Department of Neuroscience at Johns Hopkins University School of Medicine, where he made discoveries on ipRGCs. In 2004, he established his laboratory in the Department of Biology at Johns Hopkins University. He is married to Rejji Kuruvilla, a neuroscientist also working at Johns Hopkins.

== Scientific work ==
Hattar is known for his work in the area of chronobiology. He is credited with discovering that the photopigment melanopsin and associated ipRGCs play an important role in the entrainment of circadian rhythms Before Hattar's work, it was assumed that organisms entrained to daily light-dark cycles through the same mechanisms that are responsible for vision. However, case studies reported that some who were completely blind could still entrain to these cycles. This observation, coupled with the discovery of melanopsin by Ignacio Provencio, led Hattar to hypothesize that this photopigment might be responsible for photoentrainment.

== Awards and honors ==
- Albert Lehninger Research Award, 2004
- Alfred P. Sloan Research Fellow, 2006
- Lucile & David Packard Foundation Fellowship for Science and Engineering, 2006
