= Rejji Kuruvilla =

Indian-American biologist

- Known for: Research on the sympathetic nervous system development and functions
- Scientific career
- Fields: Biology
- Institutions: Johns Hopkins School of Medicine
- Doctoral advisor: Joseph Eichberg

Rejji Kuruvilla is an Indian-American biologist. She is a professor of biology at Johns Hopkins School of Medicine.

== Education ==
Kuruvilla completed a bachelor of science at St. Xavier's College, Kolkata in 1987. In 1998, she earned a doctor of philosophy at University of Houston. Her dissertation was titled "Studies on arachidonic acid depletion in diabetic rat nerve and human Schwann cells cultured in elevated glucose." Her doctoral advisor was Joseph Eichberg. Kuruvilla completed postdoctoral research on neurotrophin signaling in sympathetic neurons at Johns Hopkins School of Medicine in the lab of David Ginty.

== Career ==
Kuruvilla is a professor of biology at Johns Hopkins School of Medicine. She researches the sympathetic nervous system development and functions. Her studies explore endocytic trafficking of neurotrophins in nervous system maintenance. In 2024, she was elected a Fellow of the American Association for the Advancement of Science.
