= Clyde E. Keeler =

American geneticist (1900–1994)

Clyde Edgar Keeler
- Born: April 11, 1900; Marion, Ohio, US
- Died: April 22, 1994 (aged 94); Milledgeville, Georgia, US
- Resting place: Memory Hill Cemetery, Milledgeville, Georgia
- Education: Sc. D.
- Alma mater: Harvard University
- Known for: Studies of the Laboratory mouse, Visual System, and the Guna people
- Spouse: Dr. Johanna Abel
- Children: Irmgard (Irma) Keeler Howard
- Awards: Guggenheim Fellowship
- Scientific career
- Fields: Genetics, Medicine, Anthropology
- Institutions: Harvard University, University of Pennsylvania, Edgewood School in Connecticut, Woman's College in North Carolina, Wesleyan College, Georgia State College for Women, Central State Hospital (Milledgeville, Georgia)
- Thesis: Rodless retinae: studies on an ophthalmic mutation in the house mouse. (1926)

Clyde Edgar Keeler (April 11, 1900 – April 22, 1994) was a medical geneticist who is noted for his work on laboratory mice and the genetics of vision. His work was instrumental in the understanding of retinitis pigmentosa. He also seems to have published the first scientific paper on non-rod non-cone visual sensation.

Short biographies may be found at the web site of Georgia College, which keeps the Clyde E. Keeler collection, and at the Guggenheim Foundation, where he was made a Fellow in 1938. His daughter, Irmgard Keeler Howard, wrote a three-page obituary for The Journal of Heredity and he self-published an autobiography, The Gene Hunter.

If I went into medicine, I might save the lives of two hundred or more persons, but if I went into research and was fortunate enough to make a biomedical discovery of lasting value, I would affect the knowledge of many physicians and through them I might help to save the lives of thousands as yet unborn. So I went into my career with my eyes open.

— Clyde E. Keeler, The Gene Hunter
