= Photoentrainment =

In chronobiology, photoentrainment refers to the process by which an organism's biological clock, or circadian rhythm, synchronizes to daily cycles of light and dark in the environment. The mechanisms of photoentrainment differ from organism to organism. Photoentrainment plays a major role in maintaining proper timing of physiological processes and coordinating behavior within the natural environment. Studying organisms' different photoentrainment mechanisms sheds light on how organisms may adapt to anthropogenic changes to the environment.

== Background ==
24-hour physiological rhythms, known now as circadian rhythms, were first documented in 1729 by Jean Jacques d'Ortous de Mairan, a French astronomer who observed that mimosa plants (Mimosa pudica) would orient themselves to be toward the position of the sun despite being in a dark room. That observation spawned the field of chronobiology, which seeks to understand the mechanisms that underlie endogenously expressed daily rhythms in organisms from cyanobacteria to mammals, which includes understanding and modeling the process of photoentrainment.

Two prominent 20th-century chronobiologists, Jürgen Aschoff and Colin Pittendrigh, both worked throughout the 1960s to model of the process of photoentrainment, and despite examining the same subject, they arrived at different conclusions. Aschoff proposed a parametric model of entrainment, which assumed that organisms entrained to environmental timing cues (often referred to as zeitgebers, or "time givers" in German) gradually, changing their internal "circadian" period to be greater or less than 24 hours until it became aligned with the zeitgeber time. Conversely, Pittendreigh proposed a non-parametric model of entrainment, which assumed that organisms adjusted their internal clocks instantaneously when confronted with a light signal, or zeitgeber, that was out of sync with when their internal circadian time expected to see light.

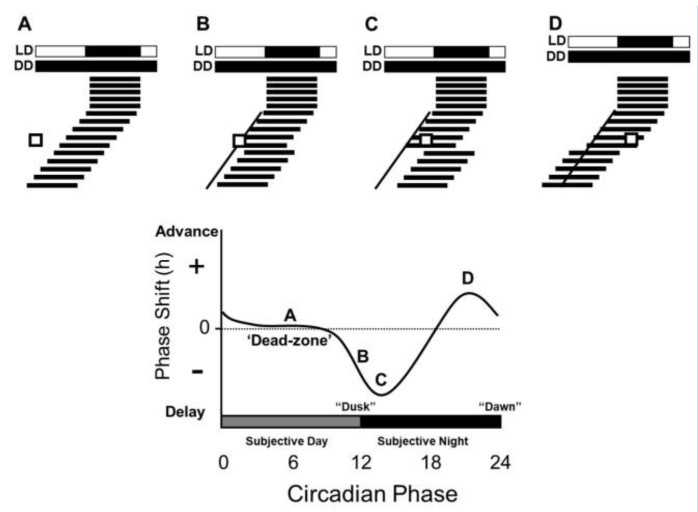
Phase-response curve and phase shifts under different testing conditions. Condition A shows that a light pulse in the subjective day does not result in a phase shift. Condition B and C shows that a light pulse in the early subjective night results in a phase delay. Condition D shows that a light pulse in the late subjective night results in a phase advance.

Pittendrigh developed his model based on the phase-response curve, which visualizes the effect of short light pulses on organisms that were free-running (not entrained to a zeitgeber). Pittendrigh determined that an organism's response to light depended on when the signal was presented. It was determined that exposure to light in the organism's early subjective night (the early portion of an organism's "normal" dark period) produced a delay in onset of activity in the following day (phase delay). Additionally, light exposure in the late subjective night resulted in advanced activity in the following day (phase advance). The phase changes experienced by the organism could be represented by a phase-response curve consisting of portions including the advance zone, delay zone, and dead zone. This model became widely accepted over Aschoff's parametric model, but it is still unclear which model most effectively explains the process of photoentrainment.

Light intensity in conditions of constant light was found to also modulate an organism's response. Exposure to higher-intensity light was found to either extend or shorten an organism's period depending on species, dubbed Aschoff's rule.

== Mechanism ==
The molecular mechanism for photoentrainment in multicellular organisms such as in fungi and animals has been linked to the transcription-translation feedback loop (TTFL), where translated protein products influence gene transcription. The TTFL is composed of both a positive and negative arm, where the positive arm proteins promote transcription of negative arm genes while the negative arm proteins inhibit the activity of the positive arm. The TTFL has been found to be autonomous and have a period of roughly 24 hours. Components of the positive and negative arms differ by organism but in mammals positive arm components include CLOCK and BMAL1 while negative arm components include PER1, PER2, CRY1, and CRY2. In the case of many mammals, light signals detected by photoreceptors in the eye send signals to the mammalian master clock located in the suprachiasmatic nucleus (SCN) which then affects the timing of the various positive and negative arms. This results in changes in the expression of the various clock proteins is what allows the organism to undergo photoentrainment.

In single celled organisms, circadian rhythms are believed to be generated without the use of a TTFL, but rather with a 3 protein complex called the KaiABC Complex. The mechanism of entrainment in this system is known to be controlled by various proteins.

== Photoentrainment in different organisms ==
Entrainment to environmental cycles is a trait with advantages, and is thus found in nearly all organisms. Many ecological relationships such as predator-prey interactions, pollinator behaviors, migration timing all require the synchronization of an organism's biological clock with the 24-hour rhythm of planet. Individuals who are not entrained, or in other words are not synchronized to the cycle of day and night, may miss out on feeding opportunities, on mating opportunities, etc, which may impact their chances of survival. The known models of both the circadian clock and mechanism of entrainment vary in different organisms across domain and kingdom, and the behavioral significance of entrainment vary as well.

=== Photoentrainment in mammals ===
Mammals, in order to survive, must wake up at specific times in order to secure meals and avoid becoming prey themselves. In mammals, the external light dark cycle entrains a master clock, which then synchronizes various circadian oscillators throughout the body known as peripheral clocks. The photopigment melanopsin is present in certain retinal ganglion cells called intrinsically photosensitive retinal ganglion cells (ipRGCs), which send signals to the suprachiasmatic nucleus (SCN), the mammalian master clock that controls circadian rhythms throughout the body. In addition to melanopsin, studies have determined from using melanopsin-knockout mice that rods and cones can also play a role in the photic responses of the SCN. Enucleation (removal of the eye) in mammals resulted in free-running rhythms indicating the eye is necessary for photoentrainment.

=== Photoentrainment in cyanobacteria ===
Photoautotrophic cyanobacteria depend on sunlight for energy, so a failure to anticipate nighttime would threaten their ability to survive and reproduce. They need sufficient glycogen reserves to last through the night. Photoentrainment also allows cyanobacteria to respond to light properly so as to prepare their photosynthetic apparatus for dawn when blue light is prominent. Appropriate synchronization to light also facilitates the temporal separation between oxygen-sensitive nitrogen fixation and oxygen-generating photosynthesis, lest the latter would inhibit the former.

Cyanobacteria can entrain to light pulses at a single cell level, but not all strains of the cyanobacteria entrain to light. While some cyanobacteria show rhythmic photosynthesis in constant light conditions, others exhibit constitutive photosynthetic activity in constant light conditions, measured by the levels of photosynthetic oxygen evolution.

=== Photoentrainment in fungi ===
Fungi, like mammals, use a TTFL-driven clock, and therefore their entrainment involves adjustments to the concentrations of certain clock proteins based on environmental stimuli. More specifically, blue light induces transcription of frequency gene frq via photoreceptor WC‐1 and its partner WC‐2, and the protein product FRQ subsequently regulates the activity of WC-1 and WC-2 via phosphorylation. Ultraviolet radiation and other light wavelengths can cause DNA damage and mutations in fungi. Since DNA replication requires chromosome unwinding and exposes the DNA molecule to UV damage, fungi need to schedule DNA replication during the time of the day with the lowest UV radiation.

== Clinical implications ==
Photoentrainment has numerous clinical implications. Light therapy can be used to treat a number of afflictions, such as jet lag, seasonal affective disorder (SAD), sleep disorders, dementia, bipolar disorder, and so on.

=== Jet lag ===
Jet lag occurs when one's circadian rhythm is out of sync with the environment, and this is usually caused by travel across time zones. People with jet lag experience symptoms such as fatigue, insomnia, headaches, etc. Light therapy has been hypothesized to help mitigate these symptoms. A study has shown that light therapy depending on the direction of one's travel can be beneficial; eastward travelers received phase advancement light therapy before their flight, and westward travelers received phase delay light therapy before their flight.

=== Seasonal affective disorder ===
Disruption of an individual's dopamine activity due to the lack of light in the winter months is thought to be a cause of seasonal affective disorder (SAD). Thus, it was hypothesized that light therapy could help increase one's retinal dopamine activity by providing light that is no longer attainable in the environment. The practice of phototherapy was started in 1984. Traditionally, one receiving phototherapy for SAD will get a morning treatment of 5000 lux per hour. The effect of this treatment is that one's circadian rhythm will be advanced. This is done in order to counteract the phase delay during winter.

=== Sleep disorders ===
Light therapy can also be used to treat circadian rhythm sleep disorders. These disorders are caused by discrepancies between one's circadian rhythm and the light/dark cycle of the environment. People with a sleep disorder experience insomnia or hypersomnia. There are a number of sleep disorders that light therapy are effective in treating, such as delayed sleep phase type (DSPT) and advanced sleep phase type (ASPT). DSPT occurs when one sleeps late and is unable to wake up early, resulting in a lack of entrainment to a typical working schedule. There are a number of methods to help resolve DSPT, including white light exposure in the morning and light restriction after 4:00 p.m., light masks, and blue light exposure in the morning. APST is marked by both sleeping and waking up early and is usually seen in older adults. Light therapy in the evening (that is administered before one's body temperature reaches its low point) may help in inducing phase delay in these patients.

=== Dementia ===
Dementia is a decline in mental functioning that results in impairment in memory, thinking, decision-making, etc. Dementia is associated with disruptions in one's sleep-wake cycle. Thus, light therapy may aid in the improvement of the disrupted sleep-wake cycle. If true, this will result in better sleep along with improved functioning. Studies have looked into light therapy as a treatment for dementia, however, the results have been conflicting. One study found that morning light therapy helped dementia patients with their sleep, yet functioning did not improve. In other trials, neither sleep nor behavior seemed to improve. Therefore, more research should be done in order to clarify the potential of light therapy as a successful treatment technique for dementia.

=== Bipolar disorder ===
Bipolar disorder is a mental disorder characterized by sudden shifts of behavior, emotions, energy, and so on, and these shifts can be called bipolar episodes. People with bipolar disorder can experience both manic episodes and depressive episodes. Bipolar disorder is difficult to treat, so light therapy was looked at as a potential solution. One relevant study was a meta-analysis of light therapy trials for bipolar disorder. The findings overall were encouraging as well as non-conclusive. The findings indicate that light therapy can limit symptoms and improve clinical response. Further, a different meta-analysis found that light therapy helped patients with their symptoms and did not cause any negative effects. However, light therapy did not impact bipolar disorder remission rates.
