= Joseph Eichberg =

American biologist

- Born: 1935 (age 90–91)
- Education: Harvard University
- Scientific career
- Fields: Biology
- Workplaces: University of Houston

Joseph Eichberg (born 1935) is an American biologist specializing in signal transduction of the nervous system. He is a professor emeritus in the department of biology and biochemistry at University of Houston. Eichberg completed his Ph.D. at Harvard University.
