= Melanopsin =

Mammalian protein found in Homo sapiens

OPN4

Identifiers
- Aliases: OPN4, MOP, opsin 4
- External IDs: OMIM: 606665; MGI: 1353425; GeneCards: OPN4

Gene location (Human)
Chr.	Chromosome 10 (human)
Band	10q23.2	Start	86,654,518 bp
Band	10q23.2	End	86,666,460 bp

Gene location (Mouse)
Chr.	Chromosome 14 (mouse)
Band	14|14 B	Start	34,312,575 bp
Band	14|14 B	End	34,322,099 bp
RNA expression pattern
Bgee	Human / Mouse (ortholog); Top expressed in: gastrocnemius muscle; putamen; nucleus accumbens; subcutaneous adipose tissue; anterior cingulate cortex; caudate nucleus; prefrontal cortex; left ventricle; right auricle of heart; muscle of thigh / Top expressed in: iris; lumbar subsegment of spinal cord; epithelium of lens; embryo; blastocyst; neural layer of retina; triceps brachii muscle; heart; extraocular muscle; facial motor nucleus; More reference expression data
BioGPS	n/a
Gene ontology
Molecular function	11-cis retinal binding; G protein-coupled photoreceptor activity; G protein-coupled receptor activity; photoreceptor activity; signal transducer activity
Cellular component	integral component of membrane; membrane; plasma membrane; photoreceptor disc membrane; integral component of plasma membrane
Biological process	regulation of circadian rhythm; signal transduction; visual perception; rhodopsin mediated signaling pathway; rhythmic process; phototransduction; response to stimulus; G protein-coupled receptor signaling pathway; entrainment of circadian clock by photoperiod; positive regulation of circadian sleep/wake cycle, sleep; detection of visible light; cellular response to light stimulus
Sources:Amigo / QuickGO
Orthologs
Databases	NCBI: entry; OMA: entry
Species	Human	Mouse
Entrez	94233	30044
Ensembl	ENSG00000122375	ENSMUSG00000021799
UniProt	Q9UHM6	Q9QXZ9
RefSeq (mRNA)	NM_033282; NM_001030015	NM_001128599; NM_013887
RefSeq (protein)	NP_001025186; NP_150598	NP_001122071; NP_038915
Location (UCSC)	Chr 10: 86.65 – 86.67 Mb	Chr 14: 34.31 – 34.32 Mb
PubMed search
- Wikidata
View/Edit Human	View/Edit Mouse

Melanopsin is a type of photopigment belonging to a larger family of light-sensitive retinal proteins called opsins and encoded in humans by the gene OPN4. In the mammalian retina, there are two additional categories of opsins, both involved in the formation of visual images: rhodopsin and photopsin (types I, II, and III) in the rod and cone photoreceptor cells, respectively.

In humans, melanopsin is found in intrinsically photosensitive retinal ganglion cells (ipRGCs). It is also found in the iris of mice and primates. Melanopsin is also found in rats, amphioxus, and other chordates. ipRGCs are photoreceptor cells which are particularly sensitive to the absorption of short-wavelength (blue) visible light and communicate information directly to the area of the brain called the suprachiasmatic nucleus (SCN), also known as the central "body clock", in mammals. Melanopsin plays an important non-image-forming role in the setting of circadian rhythms as well as other functions. Mutations in the Opn4 gene can lead to clinical disorders, such as seasonal affective disorder (SAD). According to one study, melanopsin has been found in eighteen sites in the human brain (outside the retinohypothalamic tract), intracellularly, in a granular pattern, in the cerebral cortex, the cerebellar cortex and several phylogenetically old regions, primarily in neuronal soma, not in nuclei. Melanopsin is also expressed in human cones. However, only 0.11–0.55% of human cones express melanopsin and are exclusively found in the peripheral regions of the retina. The human peripheral retina senses light at high intensities that is best explained by four different photopigment classes.

== Discovery ==
Nerve cells containing melanopsin are shown in blue in the spread out retina.

Melanopsin was discovered by Ignacio Provencio as a new opsin in the melanophores, or light-sensitive skin cells, of the African clawed frog in 1998. A year later, researchers found that mice without any rods or cones, the cells involved in image-forming vision, still entrained to a light-dark cycle. This observation led to the conclusion that neither rods nor cones, located in the outer retina, are necessary for circadian entrainment and that a third class of photoreceptor exists in the mammalian eye. Provencio and colleagues then found in 2000 that melanopsin is also present in mouse retina, specifically in ganglion cells, and that it mediates non-visual photoreceptive tasks. Melanopsin is encoded by the Opn4 gene with orthologs in a variety of organisms.

These retinal ganglion cells were found to be innately photosensitive, since they responded to light even while isolated, and were thus named intrinsically photosensitive Retinal Ganglion Cells (ipRGCs). They constitute a third class of photoreceptor cells in the mammalian retina, besides the already known rods and cones, and were shown to be the principal conduit for light input to circadian photoentrainment. In fact, it was later demonstrated by Satchidananda Panda and colleagues that melanopsin pigment may be involved in entrainment of a circadian oscillator to light cycles in mammals since melanopsin was necessary for blind mice to respond to light.

== Species distribution ==
Mammals have orthologous melanopsin genes named Opn4, which are approximately 50–55% conserved. However, non-mammalian vertebrates, including chickens, zebrafish, and Xenopus laevis, have two versions of the melanopsin gene: a mammalian-like Opn4m and a separate Opn4x from a lineage that diverged from Opn4m about 360 million years ago. Both versions are functional in these vertebrates. Mammals lost the gene Opn4x relatively early in their evolution, leading to a general reduction in photosensory capability. The loss is estimated to have occurred during the time in which nocturnal mammals were evolving.

== Structure ==
The human melanopsin gene, opn4, is expressed in ipRGCs, which comprises only 1–2% of RGCs in the inner mammalian retina, as studied by Samer Hattar and colleagues. The gene spans approximately 11.8 kb and is mapped to the long arm of chromosome 10. The gene includes nine introns and ten exons compared to the four to seven exons typically found in other human opsins. In non-mammalian vertebrates, melanopsin is found in a wider subset of retinal cells, as well as in photosensitive structures outside the retina, such as the iris muscle of the eye, deep brain regions, the pineal gland, and the skin. Paralogs of Opn4 include OPN1LW, OPN1MW, rhodopsin and encephalopsin.

Melanopsin, like all other animal opsins (e.g. rhodopsin), is a G-protein-coupled receptor (GPCR). The melanopsin protein has an extracellular N-terminal domain, an intracellular C-terminal domain, and seven alpha helices spanning through the plasma membrane. The seventh helix has a lysine that corresponds to Lys296^{7.43} in cattle rhodopsin and that is conserved in almost all opsins. This lysine binds covalently retinal via a Schiff-base, which makes melanopsin light sensitive. In fact this is abolished if the lysine is replaced by an alanine.

Melanopsin is more closely related to invertebrate visual opsins, which are rhabdomeric opsin, than to vertebrate visual opsins, which are cliary opsins. This is also reflected by the downstream signaling cascade, melanopsin couples in ipRGCs to the G-proteins G(q), G(11), and G(14), which are all of the G(q)-type. In fact, they can functionally replace each other, as a knocking out only two of them has no phenotypical effect. The G-proteins activate the phospholipase C PLCB4, which causes the TRP-channels TRPC6 and TRPC7 mediate to open so that the cell depolarizes. This is like in the photoreceptor cells of the Drosophila eye, and in contrast to the vertebrate rod and cone cells, where phototransduction eventually makes the cells hyperpolarize. Like other rhabdomeric opsins, Melanopsin has intrinsic photoisomerase activity.

== Function ==
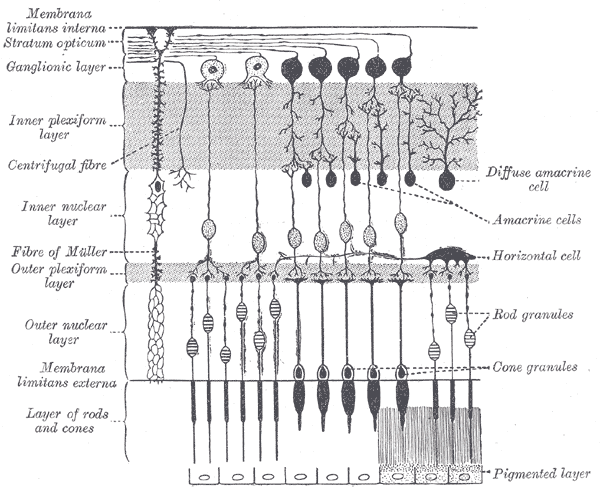
Diagram showing a cross-section of the retina. The area near the top, labeled "Ganglionic layer", contains retinal ganglion cells, a small percentage of which contain melanopsin. Light strikes the ganglia first, the rods and cones last.

Melanopsin-containing ganglion cells, like rods and cones, exhibit both light and dark adaptation; they adjust their sensitivity according to the recent history of light exposure. However, while rods and cones are responsible for the reception of images, patterns, motion, and color, melanopsin-containing ipRGCs contribute to various reflexive responses of the brain and body to the presence of light.

Evidence for melanopsin's physiological light detection has been tested in mice. A mouse cell line that is not normally photosensitive, Neuro-2a, is rendered light-sensitive by the addition of human melanopsin. The photoresponse is selectively sensitive to short-wavelength light (peak absorption ~479 nm), and has an intrinsic photoisomerase regeneration function that is chromatically shifted to longer wavelengths.

Melanopsin photoreceptors are sensitive to a range of wavelengths and reach peak light absorption at blue light wavelengths around 480 nanometers. Other wavelengths of light activate the melanopsin signaling system with decreasing efficiency as they move away from the optimum 480 nm. For example, shorter wavelengths around 445 nm (closer to violet in the visible spectrum) are half as effective for melanopsin photoreceptor stimulation as light at 480 nm.

Melanopsin in the iris of some, primarily nocturnal, mammals closes the iris when it is exposed to light. This local pupil light reflex (PLR) is absent from primates, even though their irises express melanopsin.

=== Mechanism ===
When light with an appropriate frequency enters the eye, it activates the melanopsin contained in intrinsically photosensitive retinal ganglion cells (ipRGCs), triggering an action potential. These neuronal electrical signals travel through neuronal axons to specific brain targets, such as the center of pupillary control called the olivary pretectal nucleus (OPN) of the midbrain. Consequently, stimulation of melanopsin in ipRGCs mediates behavioral and physiological responses to light, such as pupil constriction and inhibition of melatonin release from the pineal gland. The ipRGCs in the mammalian retina are one terminus of the retinohypothalamic tract that projects to the suprachiasmatic nucleus (SCN) of the hypothalamus. The suprachiasmatic nucleus is sometimes described as the brain's "master clock", as it maintains the circadian rhythm, and nerve signals from ipRGCs to the SCN entrain the internal circadian rhythm to the rising and setting of the sun. The SCN also receives input from rods and cones through the retinohypothalamic tract, so information from all three photosensitive cell types (rods, cones, and ipRGCs) in the mammalian retina are transmitted to the (SCN) SCN.

Melanopsin-containing ganglion cells are thought to influence these targets by releasing the neurotransmitters glutamate and pituitary adenylate cyclase activating polypeptide (PACAP) from their axon terminals. Melanopsin-containing ganglion cells also receive input from rods and cones that can add to the input to these pathways.

=== Effects on circadian rhythm ===
Melanopsin serves an important role in the photoentrainment of circadian rhythms in mammals. An organism that is photoentrained has aligned its activity to an approximately 24-hour cycle, the solar cycle on Earth. In mammals, melanopsin expressing axons target the suprachiasmatic nucleus (SCN) through the retinohypothalamic tract (RHT).

In mammals, the eye is the main photosensitive organ for the transmission of light signals to the brain. However, blind humans are still able to entrain to the environmental light-dark cycle, despite having no conscious perception of the light. One study exposed subjects to bright light for a prolonged duration of time and measured their melatonin concentrations. Melatonin was not only suppressed in visually unimpaired humans, but also in blind participants, suggesting that the photic pathway used by the circadian system is functionally intact despite blindness. Therefore, physicians no longer practice enucleation of blind patients, or removal of the eyes at birth, since the eyes play a critical role in the photoentrainment of the circadian pacemaker.

In mutant breeds of mice that lacked only rods, only cones, or both rods and cones, all breeds of mice still entrained to changing light stimuli in the environment, but with a limited response, suggesting that rods and cones are not necessary for circadian photoentrainment and that the mammalian eye must have another photopigment required for the regulation of the circadian clock.

Melanopsin-knockout mice display reduced photoentrainment. In comparison to wild-type mice that expressed melanopsin normally, deficits in light-induced phase shifts in locomotion activity were noted in melanopsin-null mice (Opn4 -/-). These melanopsin-deficient mice did not completely lose their circadian rhythms, as they were still able to entrain to changing environmental stimuli, albeit more slowly than normal. This indicated that, although melanopsin is sufficient for entrainment, it must work in conjunction with other photopigments for normal photoentrainment activity. Triple-mutant mice that were rod-less, cone-less, and melanopsin-less display a complete loss in the circadian rhythms, so all three photopigments in these photoreceptors, rhodopsin, photopsin and melanopsin, are necessary for photoentrainment. Therefore, there is a functional redundancy between the three photopigments in the photoentrainment pathway of mammals. Deletion of only one photopigment does not eliminate the organism's ability to entrain to environmental light-dark cycles, but it does reduce the intensity of the response.

== Regulation ==
Melanopsin undergoes phosphorylation on its intracellular carboxy tail as a way to deactivate its function. Compared to other opsins, melanopsin has an unusually long carboxy tail that contains 37 serine and threonine amino acid sites that could undergo phosphorylation. However, a cluster of seven amino acids are sufficient to deactivate zebrafish melanopsin. These sites are dephosphorylated when melanopsin is exposed to light and are unique from those that regulate rhodopsin. They are important for proper response to calcium ions in ipRGCs; lack of functional phosphorylation sites, particularly at serine-381 and serine-398, reduce the cell's response to light-induced calcium ion influx when voltage-gated calcium ion channels open.

In terms of the gene Opn4, Dopamine (DA) is a factor in the regulation of melanopsin mRNA in ipRGCs.

== Clinical significance ==
The discovery of the role of melanopsin in non-image forming vision has led to a growth in optogenetics. This field has shown promise in clinical applications, including the treatment of human eye diseases such as retinitis pigmentosa and diabetes. A missense mutation in Opn4, P10L, has been implicated in 5% of patients with Seasonal Affective Disorder (SAD). This is a condition in which people experience depressive thoughts in the winter due to decreased available light. Additionally, a melanopsin based receptor has been linked to migraine pain.

=== Restoration of vision ===
There has been recent research on the role of melanopsin in optogenetic therapy for patients with the degenerative eye disease retinitis pigmentosa (RP). Reintroducing functional melanopsin into the eyes of mice with retinal degeneration restores the pupillary light reflex (PLR). These same mice could also distinguish light stimuli from dark stimuli and showed increased sensitivity to room light. The higher sensitivity demonstrated by these mice shows promise for vision restoration that may be applicable to humans and human eye diseases.

=== Control of sleep/wake patterns ===
Melanopsin may aid in controlling sleep cycles and wakefulness. Tsunematsu and colleagues created transgenic mice that expressed melanopsin in hypothalamic orexin neurons. With a short 4-second pulse of blue light (guided by optical fibers), the transgenic mice could successfully transition from slow-wave sleep (SWS), which is commonly known as "deep sleep", to long-lasting wakefulness. After switching off the blue light, the hypothalamic orexin neurons showed activity for several tens of seconds. It has been shown that rods and cones play no role in the onset of sleep by light, distinguishing them from ipRGCs and melanopsin. This provides strong evidence that there is a link between ipRGCs in humans and alertness, particularly with high frequency light (e.g. blue light). Therefore, melanopsin can be used as a therapeutic target for controlling the sleep-wake cycle.

The light sensitivity of melanopsin (after correcting for light absorption by other parts of the eye) is used to define the melanopic lux, which reflects how strongly lit a location is as it appears to this specific opsin (as opposed to the rods and cones). This parameter is used to regulate the lighting in residential buildings. A melanopic lux appropriate for lab animal species is also recommended for regulating their sleep/wake patterns.

=== Regulation of blood glucose levels ===
In a paper published by Ye and colleagues in 2011, melanopsin was utilized to create an optogenetic synthetic transcription device that was tested in a therapeutic setting to produce Fc-glucagon-like peptide 1 (Fc-GLP-1), a fusion protein that helps control blood glucose levels in mammals with Type II diabetes. The researchers subcutaneously implanted mice with microencapsulated transgenic HEK 293 cells that were cotransfected with two vectors including the melanopsin gene and the gene of interest under an NFAT (nuclear factor of activated T cells) promoter, respectively. It is through this engineered pathway that they successfully controlled the expression of Fc-GLP-1 in doubly recessive diabetic mice and reduced hyperglycemia, or high blood glucose levels, in these mice. This shows promise for the use of melanopsin as an optogenetic tool for the treatment of Type II diabetes.

== See also ==
- Light effects on circadian rhythm
- Opsins
- Intrinsically Photosensitive Retinal Ganglion Cells (ipRGCs)
- Suprachiasmatic nucleus (SCN)
- Retinohypothalamic tract
