= Intrinsically photosensitive retinal ganglion cell =

Type of neuron in the retina of the mammalian eye

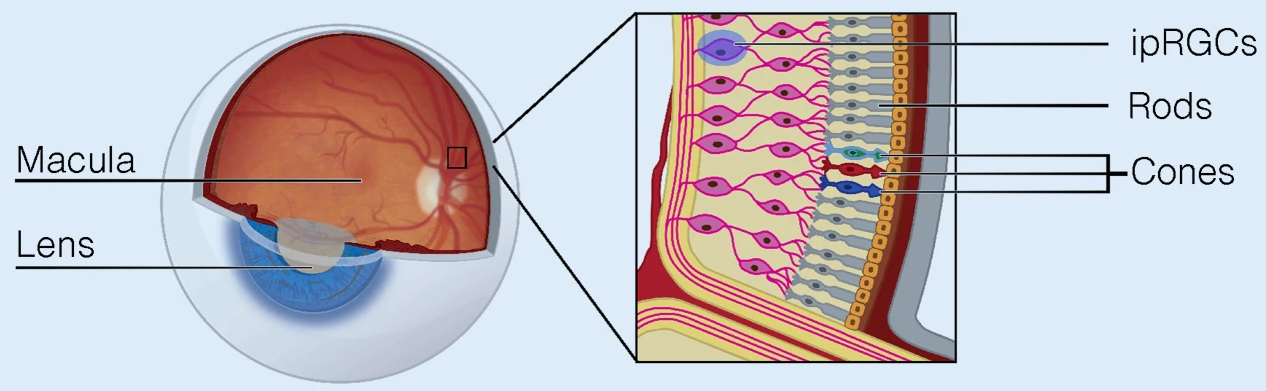
Overview of the retina photoreceptors. ipRGCs labelled at the top-right.

Intrinsically photosensitive retinal ganglion cells (ipRGCs), also called photosensitive retinal ganglion cells (pRGCs), or melanopsin-containing retinal ganglion cells (mRGCs), are a type of neuron in the retina of the mammalian eye. The presence of an additional photoreceptor was first suspected in 1927 when mice lacking rod and cone cells still responded to changing light levels through pupil constriction; this suggested that rods and cones are not the only light-sensitive tissue. However, it was unclear whether this light sensitivity arose from an additional retinal photoreceptor or elsewhere in the body. Recent research has shown that these retinal ganglion cells, unlike other retinal ganglion cells, are intrinsically photosensitive due to the presence of melanopsin, a light-sensitive protein. Therefore, they constitute a third class of photoreceptors, in addition to rod and cone cells.

== Overview ==
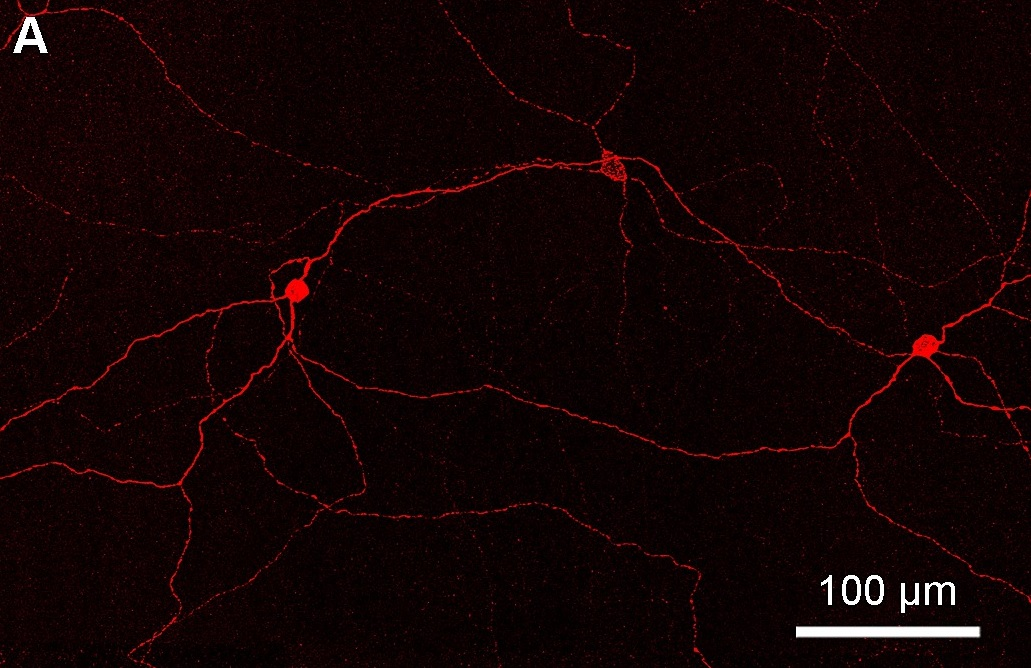
An ipRGC, shown here as a complied image of the retina from proximal inner nuclear layer to the ganglion cell layer with fluorescent labeling of melanopsin

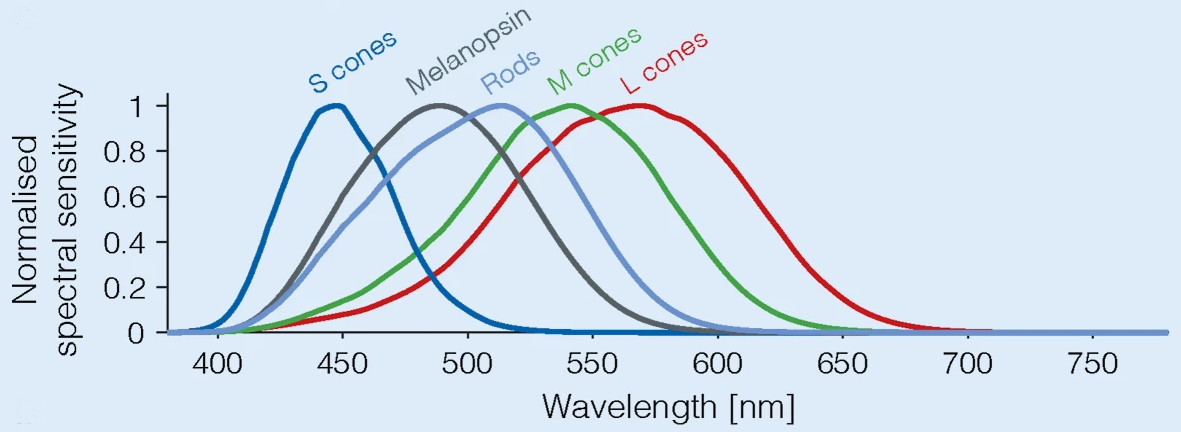
Spectral sensitivities of the photoreceptors in the human eye.

Compared to the rods and cones, the ipRGCs respond more sluggishly and signal the presence of light over the long term. They represent a very small subset (~1%) of the retinal ganglion cells. Their functional roles are non-image-forming and fundamentally different from those of pattern vision; they provide a stable representation of ambient light intensity. They have at least three primary functions:

- They play a major role in synchronizing circadian rhythms to the 24-hour light/dark cycle, providing primarily length-of-day and length-of-night information. They send light information via the retinohypothalamic tract (RHT) directly to the circadian pacemaker of the brain, the suprachiasmatic nucleus of the hypothalamus. The physiological properties of these ganglion cells match known properties of the daily light entrainment (synchronization) mechanism regulating circadian rhythms. In addition, ipRGCs could also influence peripheral tissues such as the hair follicle regeneration through a SCN-sympathetic nerve circuit.
- Photosensitive ganglion cells innervate other brain targets, such as the center of pupillary control, the olivary pretectal nucleus of the midbrain. They contribute to the regulation of pupil size and other behavioral responses to ambient lighting conditions.
- They contribute to photic regulation and acute photic suppression of release of the hormone melatonin.
- In rats, they play some role in conscious visual perception, including perception of regular gratings, light levels, and spatial information.

Photoreceptive ganglion cells have been isolated in humans, where, in addition to regulating the circadian rhythm, they have been shown to mediate a degree of light recognition in rodless, coneless subjects suffering with disorders of rod and cone photoreceptors. Work by Farhan H. Zaidi and colleagues showed that photoreceptive ganglion cells may have some visual function in humans.

The photopigment of photoreceptive ganglion cells, melanopsin, is excited by light mainly in the blue portion of the visible spectrum (absorption peaks at ~480 nanometers). The phototransduction mechanism in these cells is not fully understood, but seems likely to resemble that in invertebrate rhabdomeric photoreceptors. In addition to responding directly to light, these cells may receive excitatory and inhibitory influences from rods and cones by way of synaptic connections in the retina.

The axons from these ganglia innervate regions of the brain related to object recognition, including the superior colliculus and dorsal lateral geniculate nucleus.

== Structure ==
=== ipRGC receptor ===
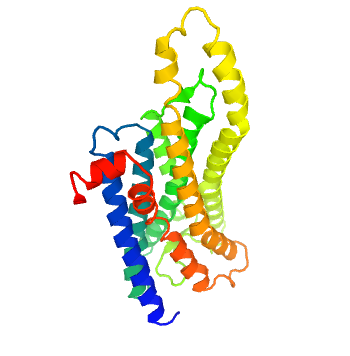
Melanopsin structure

These photoreceptor cells project both throughout the retina and into the brain. They contain the photopigment melanopsin in varying quantities along the cell membrane, including on the axons up to the optic disc, the soma, and dendrites of the cell. ipRGCs contain membrane receptors for the neurotransmitters glutamate, glycine, and GABA. Photosensitive ganglion cells respond to light by depolarizing, thus increasing the rate at which they fire nerve impulses, which is opposite to that of other photoreceptor cells, which hyperpolarize in response to light.

Results of studies in mice suggest that the axons of ipRGCs are unmyelinated.

=== Melanopsin ===
Unlike other photoreceptor pigments, melanopsin has the ability to act as both the excitable photopigment and as a photoisomerase. Unlike the visual opsins in rod cells and cone cells, which rely on the standard visual cycles for recharging all-trans-retinal back into the photosensitive 11-cis-retinal, melanopsin is able to isomerize all-trans-retinal into 11-cis-retinal itself when stimulated with another photon. An ipRGC therefore does not rely on Müller cells and/or retinal pigment epithelium cells for this conversion.

The two isoforms of melanopsin differ in their spectral sensitivity, for the 11-cis-retinal isoform is more responsive to shorter wavelengths of light, while the all-trans isoform is more responsive to longer wavelengths of light.

=== Synaptic inputs and outputs ===
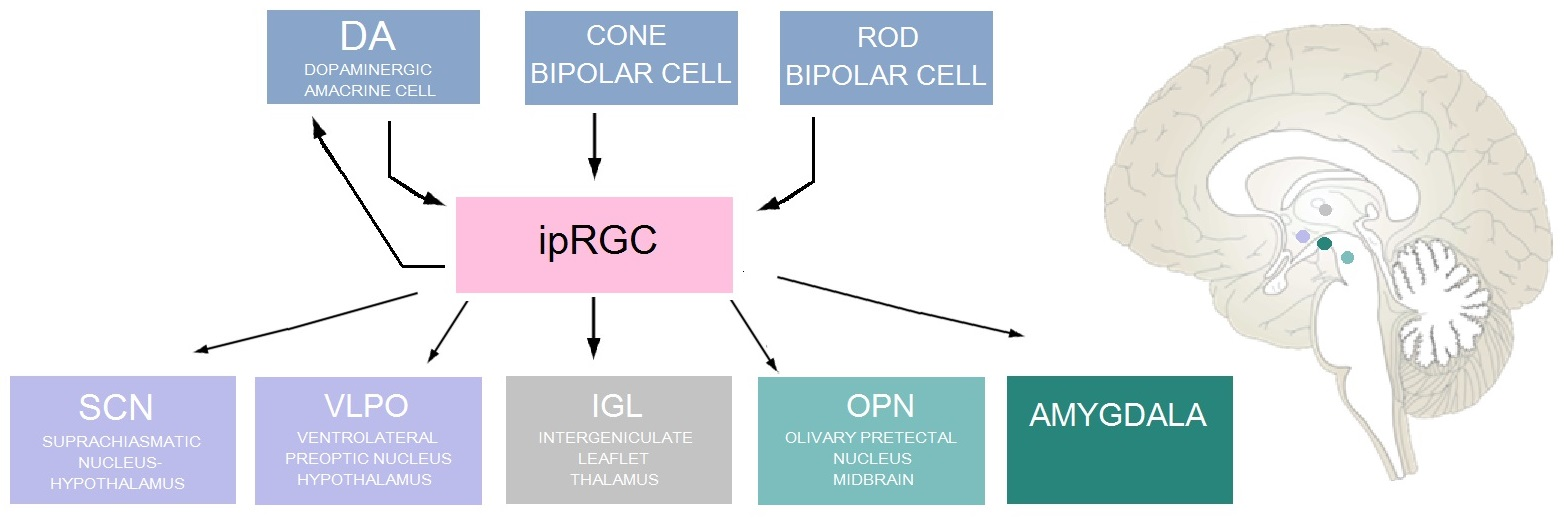
Synaptic inputs and outputs of ipRGCs and their corresponding location in the brain

==== Inputs ====
ipRGCs are both pre- and postsynaptic to dopaminergic amacrine cells (DA cells) via reciprocal synapses, with ipRGCs sending excitatory signals to the DA cells, and the DA cells sending inhibitory signals to the ipRGCs. These inhibitory signals are mediated through GABA, which is co-released from the DA cells along with dopamine. Dopamine has functions in the light-adaptation process by up-regulating melanopsin transcription in ipRGCs and thus increasing the photoreceptor's sensitivity. In parallel with the DA amacrine cell inhibition, somatostatin-releasing amacrine cells, themselves inhibited by DA amacrine cells, inhibit ipRGCs. Other synaptic inputs to ipRGC dendrites include cone bipolar cells and rod bipolar cells.

==== Outputs ====
One postsynaptic target of ipRGCs is the suprachiasmatic nucleus (SCN) of the hypothalamus, which serves as the circadian clock in an organism. ipRGCs release both pituitary adenylyl cyclase-activating protein (PACAP) and glutamate onto the SCN via a monosynaptic connection called the retinohypothalamic tract (RHT). Glutamate has an excitatory effect on SCN neurons, and PACAP appears to enhance the effects of glutamate in the hypothalamus.

It has long been observed that light primarily shifts the SCN clock during nighttime rather than daytime, a phenomenon traditionally attributed to properties intrinsic to the SCN itself. However, research by Komal et al. (2026) demonstrated that the SCN's resistance to daytime phase shifting also depends on the propensity of ipRGCs to undergo depolarization block, which limits their sustained firing under bright light. Using chemogenetic activation or violet light to bypass ipRGC gating, the authors induced large phase shifts during the daytime in mice. The same study also demonstrated that daytime phase shifts require brain circuits and neuropeptide transmitters that are not needed for nighttime shifts, and that the depolarization block in ipRGCs also constrains the magnitude of nighttime shifts. These findings suggest that ipRGC signaling to the SCN acts as an integrated pacemaker mechanism across the entire circadian cycle, rather than simply relaying light information passively.

Other post synaptic targets of ipRGCs include: the intergeniculate leaflet (IGL), a cluster of neurons located in the thalamus, which play a role in circadian entrainment; the olivary pretectal nucleus (OPN), a cluster of neurons in the midbrain that controls the pupillary light reflex; the ventrolateral preoptic nucleus (VLPO), located in the hypothalamus and is a control center for sleep; as well as to the amygdala.

== Function ==
=== Pupillary light reflex ===
Inputs and outputs to ipRGCs involved in the pupillary light reflex

Using various photoreceptor knockout mice, researchers have identified the role of ipRGCs in both the transient and sustained signaling of the pupillary light reflex (PLR). Transient PLR occurs at dim to moderate light intensities and is a result of phototransduction occurring in rod cells, which provide synaptic input onto ipRGCs, which in turn relay the information to the olivary pretectal nucleus in the midbrain. The neurotransmitter involved in the relay of information to the midbrain from the ipRGCs in the transient PLR is glutamate. At brighter light intensities the sustained PLR occurs, which involves both phototransduction of the rod providing input to the ipRGCs and phototransduction of the ipRGCs themselves via melanopsin. Researchers have suggested that the role of melanopsin in the sustained PLR is due to its lack of adaptation to light stimuli in contrast to rod cells, which exhibit adaptation. The sustained PLR is maintained by PACAP release from ipRGCs in a pulsatile manner.

=== Possible role in conscious sight ===
Experiments with rodless, coneless humans allowed another possible role for the receptor to be studied. In 2007, a new role was found for the photoreceptive ganglion cell. Zaidi and colleagues showed that in humans the retinal ganglion cell photoreceptor contributes to conscious sight as well as to non-image-forming functions like circadian rhythms, behaviour and pupillary reactions. Since these cells respond mostly to blue light, it has been suggested that they have a role in mesopic vision and that the old theory of a purely duplex retina with rod (dark) and cone (light) light vision was simplistic. Zaidi and colleagues' work with rodless, coneless human subjects hence has also opened the door into image-forming (visual) roles for the ganglion cell photoreceptor.

The discovery that there are parallel pathways for vision was made: one classic rod- and cone-based arising from the outer retina, the other a rudimentary visual brightness detector arising from the inner retina. The latter seems to be activated by light before the former. Classic photoreceptors also feed into the novel photoreceptor system, and colour constancy may be an important role as suggested by Foster.

It has been suggested by the authors of the rodless, coneless human model that the receptor could be instrumental in understanding many diseases, including major causes of blindness worldwide such as glaucoma, a disease which affects ganglion cells.

In other mammals, photosensitive ganglia have proven to have a genuine role in conscious vision. Tests conducted by Jennifer Ecker et al. found that rats lacking rods and cones were able to learn to swim toward sequences of vertical bars rather than an equally luminescent gray screen.

=== Violet-to-blue light ===
Most work suggests that the peak spectral sensitivity of the receptor is between 460 and 484 nm. Lockley et al. in 2003 showed that 460 nm (blue) wavelengths of light suppress melatonin twice as much as 555 nm (green) light, the peak sensitivity of the photopic visual system. In work by Zaidi, Lockley and co-authors using a rodless, coneless human, it was found that a very intense 481 nm stimulus led to some conscious light perception, meaning that some rudimentary vision was realized.

== Discovery ==
In 1923, Clyde E. Keeler observed that the pupils in the eyes of blind mice he had accidentally bred still responded to light. The ability of the rodless, coneless mice to retain a pupillary light reflex was suggestive of an additional photoreceptor cell.

In the 1980s, research in rod- and cone-deficient rats showed regulation of dopamine in the retina, a known neuromodulator for light adaptation and photoentrainment.

Research continued in 1991, when Russell G. Foster and colleagues, including Ignacio Provencio, showed that rods and cones were not necessary for photoentrainment, the visual drive of the circadian rhythm, nor for the regulation of melatonin secretion from the pineal gland, via rod- and cone-knockout mice. Later work by Provencio and colleagues showed that this photoresponse was mediated by the photopigment melanopsin, present in the ganglion cell layer of the retina.

The photoreceptors were identified in 2002 by Samer Hattar, David Berson and colleagues, where they were shown to be melanopsin expressing ganglion cells that possessed an intrinsic light response and projected to a number of brain areas involved in non-image-forming vision.

In 2005, Panda, Melyan, Qiu, and colleagues demonstrated that the melanopsin photopigment was the phototransduction pigment in ganglion cells. Dennis Dacey and colleagues showed in a species of Old World monkey that giant ganglion cells expressing melanopsin projected to the lateral geniculate nucleus (LGN). Previously only projections to the midbrain (pre-tectal nucleus) and hypothalamus (supra-chiasmatic nuclei, SCN) had been shown. However, a visual role for the receptor was still unsuspected and unproven.

== Research ==
As with other aspects of visual research, electrode array recording and single-cell recording are commonly used to analyze how these cells create and process signals. Using a combination of electric signals, brain connectivity, location, and morphology, as many as six (M1–M6) subpopulations of ipRGCs have been identified in mice, 5 (M1–M5) in rats, and 3 in donated human retinas (all of which seem to map to a rodent type).

Because retinal ganglion cells are required for the signal transduction from rods and cones, knocking out the entire RGC cell type to study the function of ipRGCs would not be productive. Instead, the live-animal models tend to use the following two classes of animals:

- Rodless-coneless animals, which lack both rods and cones.
- Opn4 knockouts, which cannot make their RGCs photosensitive; similar approaches include Opn4 knock-ins, which expresses something instead of or in addition to Opn4, allowing the selective targeting of the (would be) ipRGC population in genetic manipulation.

=== Research in humans ===
Attempts were made to hunt down the receptor in humans, but humans posed special challenges and demanded a new model. Unlike in other animals, researchers could not ethically induce rod and cone loss either genetically or with chemicals so as to directly study the ganglion cells. For many years, only inferences could be drawn about the receptor in humans, though these were at times pertinent.

In 2007, Zaidi and colleagues published their work on rodless, coneless humans, showing that these people retain normal responses to nonvisual effects of light. The identity of the non-rod, non-cone photoreceptor in humans was found to be a ganglion cell in the inner retina as shown previously in rodless, coneless models in some other mammals. The work was done using patients with rare diseases that wiped out classic rod and cone photoreceptor function but preserved ganglion cell function. Despite having no rods or cones, the patients continued to exhibit circadian photoentrainment, circadian behavioural patterns, melatonin suppression, and pupil reactions, with peak spectral sensitivities to environmental and experimental light that match the melanopsin photopigment. Their brains could also associate vision with light of this frequency. Clinicians and scientists are now seeking to understand the new receptor's role in human diseases and blindness.

Intrinsically photosensitive RGCs have also been implicated in the exacerbation of headache by light during migraine attacks.

== See also ==
- Bistratified cell
- Melanopsin
- Midget cell
- Parasol cell
- Photoreceptor
