= Suprachiasmatic nucleus =

Part of the brain's hypothalamus

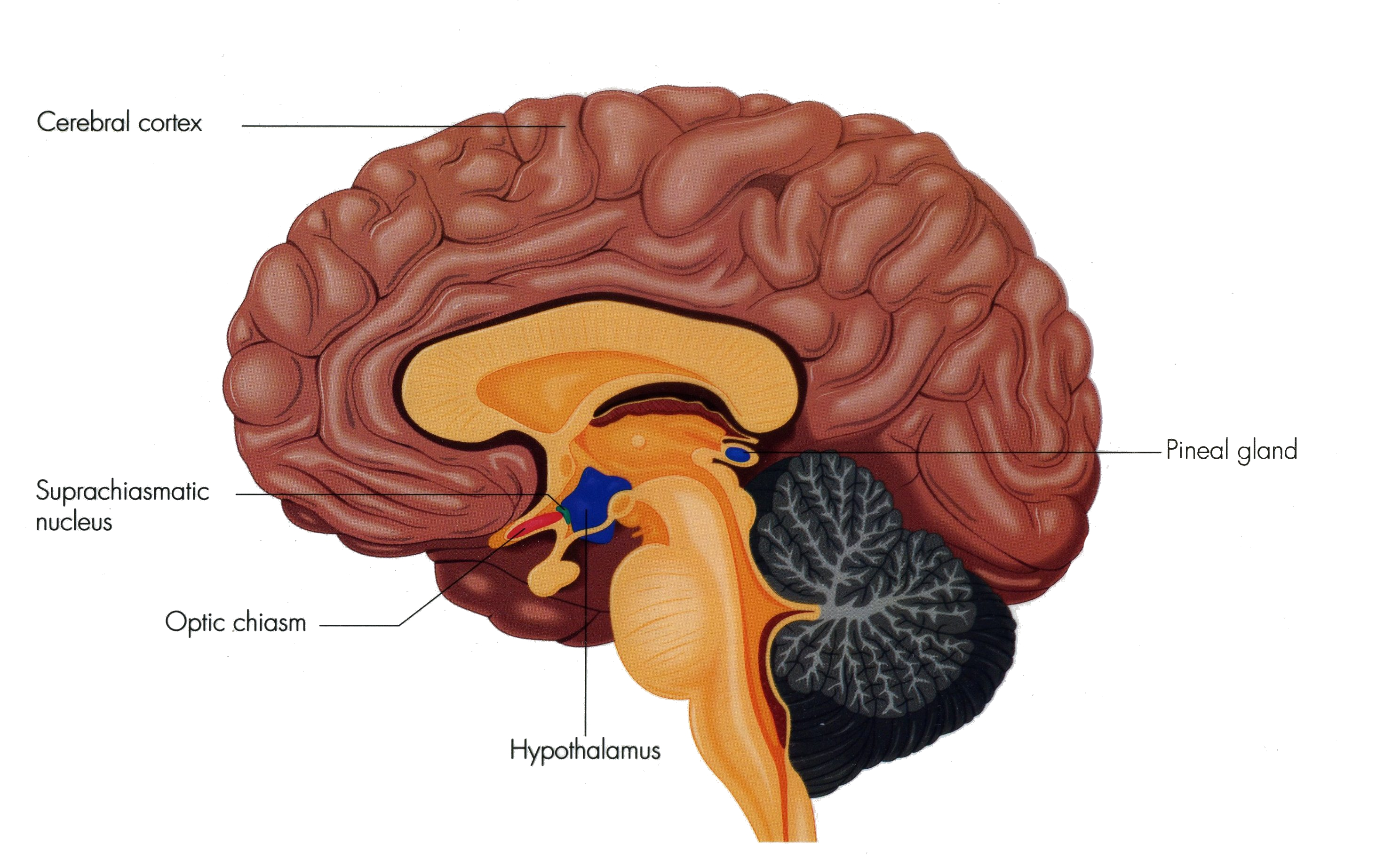
- Location of suprachiasmatic nucleus (in green between optic chiasm and hypothalamus)

Details

Identifiers
- Latin: nucleus suprachiasmaticus
- MeSH: D013493
- NeuroNames: 384
- NeuroLex ID: birnlex_1325
- TA98: A14.1.08.911
- TA2: 5720
- FMA: 67883

The suprachiasmatic nucleus or nuclei (SCN) is a small region of the brain in the hypothalamus, situated directly above the optic chiasm. It is responsible for regulating sleep cycles in animals. Reception of light inputs from photosensitive retinal ganglion cells allow it to coordinate the subordinate cellular clocks of the body and entrain to the environment. The neuronal and hormonal activities it generates regulate many different body functions in an approximately 24-hour cycle.

The SCN also interacts with many other regions of the brain. It contains several cell types, neurotransmitters and peptides, including vasopressin and vasoactive intestinal peptide.

Disruptions or damage to the SCN has been associated with different mood disorders and sleep disorders, suggesting the significance of the SCN in regulating circadian timing.

== Neuroanatomy ==
The SCN is situated in the anterior part of the hypothalamus immediately dorsal, or superior (hence supra) to the optic chiasm bilateral to (on either side of) the third ventricle. It consists of two nuclei composed of approximately 10,000 neurons.

The morphology of the SCN is species dependent. Distribution of different cell phenotypes across specific SCN regions, such as the concentration of VP-IR neurons, can cause the shape of the SCN to change.

The nucleus can be divided into ventrolateral and dorsolateral portions, also known as the core and shell, respectively. These regions differ in their expression of the clock genes, the core expresses them in response to stimuli whereas the shell expresses them constitutively.

In terms of projections, the core receives innervation via three main pathways, the retinohypothalamic tract, geniculohypothalamic tract, and projections from some raphe nuclei. The dorsomedial SCN is mainly innervated by the core and also by other hypothalamic areas. Lastly, its output is mainly to the subparaventricular zone and dorsomedial hypothalamic nucleus which both mediate the influence SCN exerts over circadian regulation of the body.

The most abundant peptides found within the SCN are arginine-vasopressin (AVP), vasoactive intestinal polypeptide (VIP), and peptide histidine-isoleucine (PHI). Each of these peptides are localized in different regions. Neurons with AVP are found dorsomedially, whereas VIP-containing and PHI-containing neurons are found ventrolaterally.

== Circadian clock ==
Different organisms such as bacteria, plants, fungi, and animals, show genetically based near-24-hour rhythms. Although all of these clocks appear to be based on a similar type of genetic feedback loop, the specific genes involved are thought to have evolved independently in each kingdom. Many aspects of mammalian behavior and physiology show circadian rhythmicity, including sleep, physical activity, alertness, hormone levels, body temperature, immune function, and digestive activity. Early experiments on the function of the SCN involved lesioning the SCN in hamsters. SCN lesioned hamsters lost their daily activity rhythms. Further, when the SCN of a hamster was transplanted into an SCN lesioned hamster, the hamster adopted the rhythms of the hamster from which the SCN was transplanted. Together, these experiments suggest that the SCN is sufficient for generating circadian rhythms in hamsters.

Later studies have shown that skeletal, muscle, liver, and lung tissues in rats generate 24-hour rhythms, which dampen over time when isolated in a dish, where the SCN maintains its rhythms. Together, these data suggest a model whereby the SCN maintains control across the body by synchronizing "slave oscillators", which exhibit their own near-24-hour rhythms and control circadian phenomena in local tissue.

The SCN receives input from specialized photosensitive ganglion cells in the retina via the retinohypothalamic tract. Neurons in the ventrolateral SCN (vlSCN) have the ability for light-induced gene expression. Melanopsin-containing ganglion cells in the retina have a direct connection to the ventrolateral SCN via the retinohypothalamic tract. When the retina receives light, the vlSCN relays this information throughout the SCN allowing entrainment, synchronization, of the person's or animal's daily rhythms to the 24-hour cycle in nature. The importance of entraining organisms, including humans, to exogenous cues such as the light/dark cycle, is reflected by several circadian rhythm sleep disorders, where this process does not function normally.

Neurons in the dorsomedial SCN (dmSCN) are believed to have an endogenous 24-hour rhythm that can persist under constant darkness (in humans averaging about 24 hours 11 min). A GABAergic mechanism is involved in the coupling of the ventral and dorsal regions of the SCN.

== Circadian rhythms of endothermic (warm-blooded) and ectothermic (cold-blooded) vertebrates ==
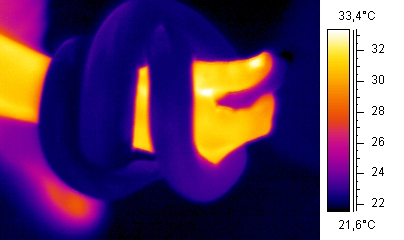
A thermographic image of an ectothermic snake wrapping around the hand of an endothermic human

Information about the direct neuronal regulation of metabolic processes and circadian rhythm-controlled behaviors is not well known among either endothermic or ectothermic vertebrates, although extensive research has been done on the SCN in model animals such as the mammalian mouse and ectothermic reptiles, particularly lizards. The SCN is known to be involved not only in photoreception through innervation from the retinohypothalamic tract, but also in thermoregulation of vertebrates capable of homeothermy as well as regulating locomotion and other behavioral outputs of the circadian clock within ectothermic vertebrates. The behavioral differences between both classes of vertebrates when compared to the respective structures and properties of the SCN as well as various other nuclei proximate to the hypothalamus provide insight into how these behaviors are the consequence of differing circadian regulation. Ultimately, many neuroethological studies must be done to completely ascertain the direct and indirect roles of the SCN on circadian-regulated behaviors of vertebrates.

=== The SCN of endotherms and ectotherms ===
In general, external temperature does not influence endothermic animal circadian rhythm because of the ability of these animals to keep their internal body temperature constant through homeostatic thermoregulation; however, peripheral oscillators (see Circadian rhythm) in mammals are sensitive to temperature pulses and will experience resetting of the circadian clock phase and associated genetic expression, suggesting how peripheral circadian oscillators may be separate entities from one another despite having a master oscillator within the SCN. Furthermore, when individual neurons of the SCN from a mouse were treated with heat pulses, a similar resetting of oscillators was observed, but when an intact SCN was treated with the same heat pulse treatment the SCN was resistant to temperature change by exhibiting an unaltered circadian oscillating phase. In ectothermic animals, particularly the ruin lizard, Podarcis siculus, temperature has been shown to affect the circadian oscillators within the SCN. This reflects a potential evolutionary relationship among endothermic and ectothermic vertebrates as ectotherms rely on environmental temperature to affect their circadian rhythms and behavior while endotherms have an evolved SCN that is resistant to external temperature fluctuations and uses photoreception as a means for entraining the circadian oscillators within their SCN. In addition, the differences of the SCN between endothermic and ectothermic vertebrates suggest that the neuronal organization of the temperature-resistant SCN in endotherms is responsible for driving thermoregulatory behaviors in those animals differently from those of ectotherms, since they rely on external temperature for engaging in certain behaviors.

=== Behaviors controlled by the SCN of vertebrates ===
Significant research has been conducted on the genes responsible for controlling circadian rhythm, in particular within the SCN. Knowledge of the gene expression of Clock (Clk) and Period2 (Per2), two of the many genes responsible for regulating circadian rhythm within the individual cells of the SCN, has allowed for a greater understanding of how genetic expression influences the regulation of circadian rhythm-controlled behaviors. Studies on thermoregulation of ruin lizards and mice have informed some connections between the neural and genetic components of both vertebrates when experiencing induced hypothermic conditions. Certain findings have reflected how evolution of SCN both structurally and genetically has resulted in the engagement of characteristic and stereotyped thermoregulatory behavior in both classes of vertebrates.

- Mice: Among vertebrates, it is known that mammals are endotherms that are capable of homeostatic thermoregulation. It has been shown that mice display thermosensitivity within the SCN. However, the regulation of body temperature in hypothermic mice is more sensitive to the amount of light in their environment. Even while fasted, mice in darkened conditions and experiencing hypothermia maintained a stable internal body temperature. In light conditions, mice showed a drop in body temperature under the same fasting and hypothermic conditions. Through analyzing genetic expression of Clock genes in wild-type and knockout strains, as well as analyzing the activity of neurons within the SCN and connections to proximate nuclei of the hypothalamus in the aforementioned conditions, it has been shown that the SCN is the center of control for circadian body temperature rhythm. This circadian control, thus, includes both direct and indirect influence of many of the thermoregulatory behaviors that mammals engage in to maintain homeostasis.
- Ruin lizards: Several studies have been conducted on the genes expressed in circadian oscillating cells of the SCN during various light and dark conditions, as well as effects from inducing mild hypothermia in reptiles. In terms of structure, the SCNs of lizards have a closer resemblance to those of mice, possessing a dorsomedial portion and a ventrolateral core. However, genetic expression of the circadian-related Per2 gene in lizards is similar to that in reptiles and birds, despite the fact that birds have been known to have a distinct SCN structure consisting of a lateral and medial portion. Studying the lizard SCN because of the lizard's small body size and ectothermy is invaluable to understanding how this class of vertebrates modifies its behavior within the dynamics of circadian rhythm, but it has not yet been determined whether the systems of cold-blooded vertebrates were slowed as a result of decreased activity in the SCN or showed decreases in metabolic activity as a result of hypothermia.

== Other signals from the retina ==
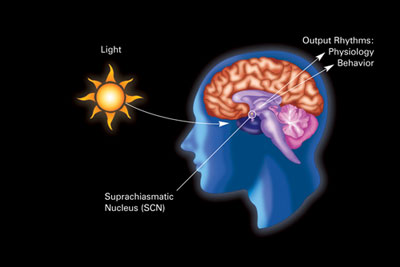
A variation of an eskinogram showing the influence of light and darkness on circadian rhythms and related physiology and behavior through the SCN in humans

The SCN is one of many nuclei that receive nerve signals directly from the retina.

Some of the others are the lateral geniculate nucleus (LGN), the superior colliculus, the basal optic system, and the pretectum:

- The LGN passes information about color, contrast, shape, and movement on to the visual cortex and itself signals to the SCN.
- The superior colliculus controls the movement and orientation of the eye.
- The basal optic system also controls eye movements.
- The pretectum controls the size of the pupil.

== Genetic basis of SCN function ==
The SCN is the central circadian pacemaker of mammals, serving as the coordinator of mammalian circadian rhythms. Neurons in an intact SCN show coordinated circadian rhythms in electrical activity. Neurons isolated from the SCN have been shown to produce and sustain circadian rhythms in vitro, suggesting that each individual neuron of the SCN can function as an independent circadian oscillator at the cellular level. Each cell of the SCN synchronizes its oscillations to the cells around it, resulting in a network of mutually reinforced and precise oscillations constituting the SCN master clock.

=== Mammals ===
The SCN functions as a circadian biological clock in vertebrates including teleosts, reptiles, birds, and mammals. In mammals, the rhythms produced by the SCN are driven by a transcription-translation negative feedback loop (TTFL) composed of interacting positive and negative transcriptional feedback loops. Within the nucleus of an SCN cell, the genes Clock and Bmal1 (mop3) encode the BHLH-PAS transcription factors CLOCK and BMAL1 (MOP3), respectively. CLOCK and BMAL1 are positive activators that form CLOCK-BMAL1 heterodimers. These heterodimers then bind to E-boxes upstream of multiple genes, including per and cry, to enhance and promote their transcription and eventual translation. In mammals, there are three known homologs for the period gene in Drosophila, namely per1, per2, and per3.

As per and cry are transcribed and translated into PER and CRY, the proteins accumulate and form heterodimers in the cytoplasm. The heterodimers are phosphorylated at a rate that determines the length of the transcription-translation feedback loop (TTFL) and then translocate back into the nucleus where the phosphorylated PER-CRY heterodimers act on CLOCK and/or BMAL1 to inhibit their activity. Although the role of phosphorylation in the TTFL mechanism is known, the specific kinetics are yet to be elucidated. As a result, PER and CRY function as negative repressors and inhibit the transcription of per and cry. Over time, the PER-CRY heterodimers degrade and the cycle begins again with a period of about 24.5 hours. The integral genes involved, termed "clock genes", are highly conserved throughout both SCN-bearing vertebrates like mice, rats, and birds as well as in non-SCN bearing animals such as Drosophila.

== Electrophysiology ==
Neurons in the SCN fire action potentials in a 24-hour rhythm, even under constant conditions. At mid-day, the firing rate reaches a maximum, and, during the night, it falls again. Rhythmic expression of circadian regulatory genes in the SCN requires depolarization in the SCN neurons via calcium and cAMP. Thus, depolarization of SCN neurons via cAMP and calcium contributes to the magnitude of the rhythmic gene expression in the SCN.

Further, the SCN synchronizes nerve impulses which spread to various parasympathetic and sympathetic nuclei. The sympathetic nuclei drive glucocorticoid output from the adrenal gland which activates Per1 in the body cells, thus resetting the circadian cycle of cells in the body. Without the SCN, rhythms in body cells dampen over time, which may be due to lack of synchrony between cells.

Many SCN neurons are sensitive to light stimulation via the retina. The photic response is likely linked to effects of light on circadian rhythms. In addition, application of melatonin in live rats and isolated SCN cells can decrease the firing rate of these neurons. Variances in light input due to jet lag, seasonal changes, and constant light conditions all change the firing rhythm in SCN neurons demonstrating the relationship between light and SCN neuronal functioning.

== Clinical significance ==
=== Irregular sleep-wake rhythm disorder ===
The exact cause of Irregular sleep–wake rhythm (ISWR) disorder is unclear, but it is associated with several factors, including structural damage to the SCN, decreased responsiveness of the circadian clock to light and other stimuli, and minimal or irregular exposure to stimulating light during the circadian daytime in certain populations. Some studies in patients with Alzheimer's disease associated reduced daytime lighting with a decrease in nocturnal melatonin production and greater wakefulness at night.

=== Major depressive disorder ===
Major depressive disorder has been associated with altered circadian rhythms and weaker expression of clock genes. When SCN function was disrupted in a study in mice by altering the expression of Bmal1, researchers observed anxious behavior, helplessness, and despair, along with abnormal glucocorticoid levels and weight gain.

=== Alzheimer's disease ===
Functional disruption of the SCN has been observed in the early stages of Alzheimer's disease. Changes in the SCN and melatonin secretion patterns are major factors in circadian rhythm disturbances, impacting sleep and body temperature cycles. Patients with Alzheimer's disease may develop insomnia, hypersomnia, and other sleep disorders due to degeneration of the SCN and other neurotransmitter dysfunction.

== History ==
The idea that the SCN is the main sleep cycle regulator in mammals was proposed by Robert Moore, who conducted experiments using radioactive amino acids to find where the termination of the retinohypothalamic projection occurs in rodents. Early lesioning experiments in mouse, guinea pig, cat, and opossum established how removal of the SCN results in ablation of circadian rhythm in mammals.

== See also ==
- Chronobiology
- Photosensitive ganglion cell
- Sense of time
- Retinohypothalamic tract
- Shift work sleep disorder
- Non-24-hour sleep–wake disorder
