= Classification of sleep disorders =

- Specialty: Sleep medicine

Classification of sleep disorders comprises systems for classifying medical disorders associated with sleep. Systems have changed, increasingly using technological discoveries to advance the understanding of sleep and recognition of sleep disorders.

Three systems of classification are in use worldwide: the International Classification of Diseases (ICD), the Diagnostic and Statistical Manual of Mental Disorders (DSM), and the International Classification of Sleep Disorders (ICSD). The ICD and DSM lump different disorders together, while the ICSD tends to split related disorders into multiple discrete categories. There has, over the last 60 years, occurred a slow confluence of the three systems of classification. The validity and reliability of various sleep disorders are yet to be proved and need further research within the ever-changing field of sleep medicine.

== Classification systems ==
Systems for the classification of sleep disorders are used to classify medical disorders related to human sleep patterns. Three systems of classification are in use worldwide:

- the International Classification of Diseases (ICD) developed by the World Health Organization (WHO) and intended for use by general and more specialized practitioners,
- the Diagnostic and Statistical Manual of Mental Disorders (DSM) from the American Psychiatric Association (APA) for psychiatrists and general practitioners, and
- the International Classification of Sleep Disorders (ICSD), an advanced system cultured by the American Academy of Sleep Medicine (AASM) for sleep specialists.

The ICD and DSM lump different disorders together, while the ICSD tends to split related disorders into multiple discrete categories. There has, over the last 60 years, occurred a slow confluence of the three major classification systems.

== History ==
=== Milestones ===
The first book on sleep was published in 1830 by Robert MacNish; it described sleeplessness, nightmares, sleepwalking and sleep-talking. Narcolepsy, hypnogogic hallucination, wakefulness and somnolence were mentioned by other authors of the nineteenth century. Westphal, in 1877, described first case of narcolepsy, the name coined later by Gelineu in 1880 in association with cataplexy. Lehermitte called it paroxysmal hypersomnia in 1930 to differentiate it from prolonged hypersomnia. Roger in 1932 coined the term parasomnia and classified hypersomnia, insomnia and parasomnia. Kleitman in 1939 recognized types of parasomnias as nightmares, night terrors, somniloquy (sleep-talking), somnambulism (sleepwalking), bruxism (grinding of teeth), jactatians, enuresis, delirium, nonepileptic convulsions and personality dissociation. Broughton in 1968 developed classification of the arousal disorders as confusional arousals: night terrors and sleep walking. Insomnias were classified as primary and secondary until 1970 when they were recognized as symptoms of other disorders. Sir William Osler in 1906 correlated snoring, obesity and somnolence (sleepiness) to Dicken's description of Joe. Charles Burwell in 1956 recognized obstructive sleep apnea as Pickwickian syndrome. Circadian rhythm sleep disorders were discovered in 1981 by Weitzman as delayed sleep phase syndrome in contrast to advanced sleep phase syndrome in 1979.

=== Evolution of classifications of sleep disorders ===
Classification of sleep disorders, as developed in the 19th century, used primarily three categories: insomnia, hypersomnia and nightmare. In the 20th century, increasingly in the last half of it, technological discoveries led to rapid advances in the understanding of sleep and recognition of sleep disorders. Major sleep disorders were defined following the development of electroencephalography (EEG) in 1924 by Hans Berger.

| Year | ICSD | ICD | DSM | Development |
|---|---|---|---|---|
| 1955 | | ICD-7R | | Disturbance of sleep was seen as a symptom of other diseases |
| 1965 | | ICD-8 | | Recognized as both a disease and a symptom of other diseases |
| 1968 | | | DSM-II | Disorder of Sleep as an independent category |
| 1975 | | ICD-9 | | Organic sleep disorder, nonorganic sleep disorder and as symptom of other diseases |
| 1979 | Nosology | | | Clinical classification into four major groups: Disorder of initiating and maintaining sleep (DIMS) - Insomnias, Disorder of Excessive sleep (DOES) - Hypersomnias, Disorder of sleep-wake schedule (Circadian rhythm disorders) and Parasomnias |
| 1980 | | ICD-CM | DSM-III | Manifestation of other disorders with physical manifestation, as Sleep walking and Sleep terror |
| 1987 | | | DSM-III-R | Sleep Disorders were classified into dysomnias and parasomnias. |
| 1990 | ICSD | | | Expanded previous system into Dysomnias, Parasomnias, Symptomatic and Proposed disorder of sleep |
| 1990 | | ICD-10 | | Organic sleep disorders included under nervous system disorder, nonorganic under psychiatric disorders and a third category as manifestation of other diseases |
| 1994 | | | DSM-IV | Dyssomnias, Parasomnias, Manifestation of mental disorders and Other |
| 1997 | ICSD-R | | | First detailed classification of various sleep disorders: Dyssomnias; 1. Intrinsic Sleep Disorders; 2. Extrinsic Sleep Disorders; 3. Circadian Rhythm Sleep Disorders; Parasomnias; 1. Arousal Disorders; 2. Sleep-Wake Transition Disorders; 3. Parasomnias Usually Associated with REM Sleep; 4. Other Parasomnias; Sleep Disorders Associated with Mental, Neurologic, or Other Medical Disorders; 1. Associated with Mental Disorders; 2. Associated with Neurologic Disorders; 3. Associated with Other Medical Disorders; 4. Proposed Sleep Disorders |
| 2000 | | | DSM-IV-TR | Primary sleep disorders; Dyssomnias; Insomnias; Hypersomnias; Recurrent Hypersomnias; Narcolepsy; Breathing related sleep disorder; Circadian rhythm sleep disorders; Movement disorder of sleep; Parasomnias; Secondary sleep disorders associated with other mental disorders and substance use. |
| 2005 | ICSD-2 | | | Most extensive classification of sleep disorders |
| 2010 | | ICD-10-CM | | Three major categories, F51 as nonorganic sleep disorders, G47 organic sleep disorders and R- as symptoms of sleep disorders |
| 2013 | ICSD-3 | | DSM-V | Lumping and splitting of sleep disorders and concordance of two systems |
| 2015 | | ICD-11 Beta | | Proposed beta version yet to be finalized in line with ICDS3 and DSM V |

== Validity and reliability ==
Diagnoses of sleep disorders are based on self-assessment questionnaires, clinical interview, physical examination and laboratory procedures. As with many self-assessment diagnoses, the validity and reliability of these tests can vary, but with additional professional evaluation many receive successful treatment options. The variety, accessibility, and affordability of treatments has improved with the development of sleep medicine.

== The International Classification of Sleep Disorders (ICSD) ==
The International Classification of Sleep Disorders (ICSD) was produced by the American Academy of Sleep Medicine (AASM) in association with the European Sleep Research Society, the Japanese Society of Sleep Research, and the Latin American Sleep Society. The classification was developed as a revision and update of the Diagnostic Classification of Sleep and Arousal Disorders (DCSAD) that was produced by both the Association of Sleep Disorders Centers (ASDC) and the Association for the Psychophysiological Study of Sleep and was published in the journal Sleep in 1979.

1. Disorder of initiating and maintain sleep (DIMS) - Insomnias
2. Disorder of Excessive sleep (DOES) - Hypersomnias
3. Disorder of sleep wake schedule
4. Parasomnias

The International Classification of Sleep Disorders (ICSD) uses a multiaxial system for stating and coding diagnoses both in clinical reports or for data base purposes. The axial system uses International Classification of Diseases (ICD-9- CM) coding wherever possible. Additional codes are included for procedures and physical signs of particular interest to sleep disorders clinicians and researchers. Diagnoses and procedures are listed and coded on three main "axes." The axial system is arranged as follows:

- Axis A ICSD Classification of Sleep Disorders
- Axis B ICD-9-CM Classification of Procedures
- Axis C ICD-9-CM Classification of Diseases (nonsleep diagnoses).

=== ICSD - I Revised 1997 ===
==== Dyssomnias ====
1. Intrinsic Sleep Disorders
2. Extrinsic Sleep Disorders
3. Circadian Rhythm Sleep Disorders

==== Parasomnias ====
1. Arousal Disorders
2. Sleep-Wake Transition Disorders
3. Parasomnias Usually Associated with REM Sleep
4. Other Parasomnias

==== Sleep Disorders Associated with Mental, Neurologic, or Other Medical Disorders ====
1. Associated with Mental Disorders
2. Associated with Neurologic Disorders
3. Associated with Other Medical Disorders

==== Proposed Sleep Disorders ====
ICSD 2 is tabulated in the main article International Classification of Sleep Disorders

=== ICSD - 3 ===
The last edition of ICSD-3 is a unified classification of sleep disorders. It includes seven major categories: insomnia disorders, sleep-related breathing disorders, central disorders of hypersomnolence, circadian rhythm sleep-wake disorders, sleep-related movement disorders, parasomnias, and other sleep disorders. Each of these categories has several subgroups:

==== 1. Insomnia ====
1. Chronic insomnia disorder
2. Short-term insomnia disorder
3. Other insomnia disorder

==== 2. Sleep-related breathing disorders ====
1. Obstructive sleep apnea (OSA) disorders
  1. OSA, adult
  2. OSA, pediatric
2. Central sleep apnea syndromes
  1. Central sleep apnea with Cheyne-Stokes breathing
  2. Central sleep apnea due to a medical disorder without Cheyne-Stokes breathing
  3. Central sleep apnea due to high altitude periodic breathing
  4. Central sleep apnea due to a medication or substance
  5. Primary central sleep apnea
  6. Primary central sleep apnea of infancy
  7. Primary central sleep apnea of prematurity
  8. Treatment-emergent central sleep apnea
3. Sleep-related hypoventilation disorders
  1. Obesity hypoventilation syndrome
  2. Congenital central alveolar hypoventilation syndrome
  3. Late-onset central hypoventilation with hypothalamic dysfunction
  4. Idiopathic central alveolar hypoventilation
  5. Sleep-related hypoventilation due to a medication or substance
  6. Sleep-related hypoventilation due to a medical disorder
4. Sleep-related hypoxemia disorder
5. Isolated symptoms and normal variants

==== 3. Central disorders of hypersomnolence ====
1. Narcolepsy type 1
2. Narcolepsy type 2
3. Idiopathic hypersomnia
4. Kleine-Levin syndrome
5. Hypersomnia due to a medical disorder
6. Hypersomnia due to a medication or substance
7. Hypersomnia associated with a psychiatric disorder
8. Insufficient sleep syndrome

==== 4. Circadian rhythm sleep-wake disorders ====
1. Delayed sleep-wake phase disorder
2. Advanced sleep-wake phase disorder
3. Irregular sleep-wake rhythm disorder
4. Non-24-h sleep-wake rhythm disorder
5. Shift work disorder
6. Jet lag disorder
7. Circadian sleep-wake disorder not otherwise specified

==== 5. Sleep-related movement disorders ====
1. Restless legs syndrome
2. Periodic limb movement disorder
3. Sleep-related leg cramps
4. Sleep-related bruxism
5. Sleep-related rhythmic movement disorder
6. Benign sleep myoclonus of infancy
7. Propriospinal myoclonus at sleep onset
8. Sleep-related movement disorder due to a medical disorder
9. Sleep-related movement disorder due to a medication or substance
10. Sleep-related movement disorder, unspecified
11. Isolated symptoms and normal variants
  1. Excessive fragmentary myoclonus
  2. Hypnagogic foot tremor and alternating leg muscle activation
  3. Sleep starts (hypnic jerks)

==== 6. Parasomnias ====
1. NREM-related parasomnias
  1. Confusional arousals
  2. Sleepwalking
  3. Sleep terrors
  4. Sleep-related eating disorder
2. REM-related parasomnias
  1. REM sleep behavior disorder
  2. Recurrent isolated sleep paralysis
  3. Nightmare disorder
3. Other parasomnias
  1. Exploding head syndrome
  2. Sleep-related hallucinations
  3. Sleep enuresis
  4. Parasomnia due to a medical disorder
  5. Parasomnia due to a medication or substance
  6. Parasomnia, unspecified
4. Isolated symptoms and normal variants
  1. Sleep talking

== International Classification of Disease (ICD) ==
=== ICD-7R 1955 ===
- 780.7 Disturbance of sleep

=== ICD-8 1965 ===
- 306.4 Specific disorder of sleep
- 780.6 Disturbance of sleep

=== ICD-9 1975 ===
==== 327 Organic sleep disorders ====
===== 327.0 Organic disorders of initiating and maintaining sleep [organic insomnia] =====
- 327.00 Organic insomnia, unspecified
- 327.01 Insomnia due to medical condition classified elsewhere
- 327.02 Insomnia due to mental disorder
- 327.09 Other organic insomnia

===== 327.1 Organic disorder of excessive somnolence [organic hypersomnia] =====
- 327.10 Organic hypersomnia, unspecified
- 327.11 Idiopathic hypersomnia with long sleep time
- 327.12 Idiopathic hypersomnia without long sleep time
- 327.13 Recurrent hypersomnia
- 327.14 Hypersomnia due to medical condition classified elsewhere
- 327.15 Hypersomnia due to mental disorder
- 327.19 Other organic hypersomnia

===== 327.2 Organic sleep apnea =====
- 327.20 Organic sleep apnea, unspecified
- 327.21 Primary central sleep apnea
- 327.22 High altitude periodic breathing
- 327.23 Obstructive sleep apnea (adult)(pediatric)
- 327.24 Idiopathic sleep related non-obstructive alveolar hypoventilation
- 327.25 Congenital central alveolar hypoventilation syndrome
- 327.26 Sleep related hypoventilation/hypoxemia in conditions classifiable elsewhere
- 327.27 Central sleep apnea in conditions classified elsewhere
- 327.29 Other organic sleep apnea

===== 327.3 Circadian rhythm sleep disorder =====
- 327.30 Circadian rhythm sleep disorder, unspecified
- 327.31 Circadian rhythm sleep disorder, delayed sleep phase type
- 327.32 Circadian rhythm sleep disorder, advanced sleep phase type
- 327.33 Circadian rhythm sleep disorder, irregular sleep-wake type
- 327.34 Circadian rhythm sleep disorder, free-running type
- 327.35 Circadian rhythm sleep disorder, jet lag type
- 327.36 Circadian rhythm sleep disorder, shift work type
- 327.37 Circadian rhythm sleep disorder in conditions classified elsewhere
- 327.39 Other circadian rhythm sleep disorder

===== 327.4 Organic parasomnia =====
- 327.40 Organic parasomnia, unspecified
- 327.41 Confusional arousals
- 327.42 REM sleep behavior disorder
- 327.43 Recurrent isolated sleep paralysis
- 327.44 Parasomnia in conditions classified elsewhere
- 327.49 Other organic parasomnia

===== 327.5 Organic sleep related movement disorders =====
- 327.51 Periodic limb movement disorder
- 327.52 Sleep related leg cramps
- 327.53 Sleep related bruxism
- 327.59 Other organic sleep related movement disorders

===== 307.4 Specific disorders of sleep of nonorganic origin =====
- 307.40 Nonorganic sleep disorder, unspecified
- 307.41 Transient disorder of initiating or maintaining sleep
- 307.42 Persistent disorder of initiating or maintaining sleep
- 307.43 Transient disorder of initiating or maintaining wakefulness
- 307.44 Persistent disorder of initiating or maintaining wakefulness
- 307.45 Circadian rhythm sleep disorder of nonorganic origin
- 307.46 Sleep arousal disorder
- 307.47 Other dysfunctions of sleep stages or arousal from sleep
- 307.48 Repetitive intrusions of sleep
- 307.49 Other specific disorders of sleep of nonorganic origin

===== 780.5 Sleep disturbances =====
- 780.50 Sleep disturbance, unspecified
- 780.51 Insomnia with sleep apnea, unspecified
- 780.52 Insomnia, unspecified
- 780.53 Hypersomnia with sleep apnea, unspecified
- 780.54 Hypersomnia, unspecified
- 780.55 Disruption of 24 hour sleep wake cycle, unspecified
- 780.56 Dysfunctions associated with sleep stages or arousal from sleep
- 780.57 Unspecified sleep apnea
- 780.58 Sleep related movement disorder, unspecified
- 780.59 Other sleep disturbances

=== ICD-NA (1997) ===
==== G47 Sleep disorders ====
- Excl.: nocturnal myoclonus (G25.80), nightmares (F51.5), nonorganic sleep disorders (F51.-), sleep terrors (F51.4), sleepwalking (F51.3)

===== G47.2 Disorders of the sleep-wake schedule =====
- G47.20 Transient sleep wake schedule disorder
- G47.21 Advanced sleep phase disorder
- G47.22 Delayed sleep phase syndromes
- G47.23 Irregular sleep-wake pattern
- G47.24 Non 24 hour sleep wake cycle
- G47.28 Other disorder of sleep wake schedule

===== G47.3 Sleep apnoea =====
- Sleep related respiratory failure (ondine)
- Excl. pickwickian syndrome (E66.2), sleep apnoea of newborn (P28.3)
- G47.30 Alveolar hypoventilation syndrome
- G47.31 Central sleep apnoea
- G47.32 Obstructive sleep apnoea
- G47.38 Other sleep apnoea

===== G47.4 Narcolepsy and cataplexy =====
- G47.40 Narcolepsy
- G47.41 Cataplexy
- G47.42 Sleep paralysis
- G47.43 Hypnogogic and hypnopompic hallucination
- G47.44 Any combination of narcolepsy, cataplexy, Sleep paralysis, Hypnogogic and hypnopompic hallucination
- G47.48 Other forms of narcolepsy and cataplexy

===== G47.8 Other sleep disorders =====
- Excl: Other sudden death, cause unknown (R96-)
- Sleep apnoea (G47.3)
- newborn (R96.-)
- Sudden infant death syndrome (R95)
- G47.80 Other REM sleep related parasomnias
  - Excl. nightmares (F51.5), Sleep paralysis (G47.42 )
  - G47.800 REM sleep related behavior disorder (phantasmagorias)
  - G47.801 Impaired REM sleep related non painful penile erection
  - G47.802 REM sleep related painful penile erection
  - G47.803 REM sleep related cardiac sinus arrest
  - G47.804 REM sleep related headache (use additional code if required to indicate type of headache)
- G47.81 Other non REM sleep related parasomnias
  - Excl: benign neonatal sleep syndrome (G25.37)
  - G47.810 Sleep related bruxism
  - G47.811 Sleep related enuresis
  - G47.812 Non-REM-sleep related abnormal swallowing syndrome
  - G47.813 Nocturnal paroxysmal dystonia
- G47.82 Sleep arousal disorders, confusional arousal, Sleep drunkenness
- G47.83 Sleep-wake transition disorders
  - Excl. nocturnal leg cramps (R25.20)
  - G47.830 Sleep related rhythmic movement disorder, head-banging (jactatio capitis noctunus)
  - G47.831 Sleep starts
  - G47.832 Sleepwalking
- G47.84 Kleine-Levin syndrome, Recurrent hypersomnia
- G47.88 Other specified sleep disorders

==== F51 Nonorganic sleep disorders ====
- Excl.: sleep disorders (organic) (G47.-)

===== F51.2 Nonorganic disorder of the sleep-wake schedule =====
- Psychogenic inversion of:
  - circadian
  - nyctohemeral
  - sleep rhythm
- Excl.: disorders of the sleep-wake schedule (organic) (G47.2)

==== P28.3 Primary sleep apnoea of newborn ====
- Sleep apnoea of newborn:
  - central
  - NOS
  - obstructive

==== P28.4 Other apnoea of newborn ====
- Apnoea (of):
  - newborn, obstructive
  - prematurity Excl.: obstructive sleep apnoea of newborn (P28.3)

=== ICD-10-CM 2016 ===
==== G47 Sleep disorders ====
===== G47.0 Insomnia =====
- G47.00 ...... unspecified
- G47.01 ...... due to medical condition
- G47.09 Other insomnia

===== G47.1 Hypersomnia =====
- G47.10 ...... unspecified
- G47.11 Idiopathic hypersomnia with long sleep time
- G47.12 Idiopathic hypersomnia without long sleep time
- G47.13 Recurrent hypersomnia
- G47.14 ...... due to medical condition
- G47.19 Other hypersomnia

===== G47.2 Circadian rhythm sleep disorders =====
- G47.20 Circadian rhythm sleep disorder, unspecified type
- G47.21 Circadian rhythm sleep disorder, delayed sleep phase type
- G47.22 Circadian rhythm sleep disorder, advanced sleep phase type
- G47.23 Circadian rhythm sleep disorder, irregular sleep wake type
- G47.24 Circadian rhythm sleep disorder, free running type
- G47.25 Circadian rhythm sleep disorder, jet lag type
- G47.26 Circadian rhythm sleep disorder, shift work type
- G47.27 Circadian rhythm sleep disorder in conditions classified elsewhere
- G47.29 Other circadian rhythm sleep disorder

===== G47.3 Sleep apnea =====
- G47.30 ...... unspecified
- G47.31 Primary central sleep apnea
- G47.32 High altitude periodic breathing
- G47.33 Obstructive sleep apnea (adult) (pediatric)
- G47.34 Idiopathic sleep related nonobstructive alveolar hypoventilation
- G47.35 Congenital central alveolar hypoventilation syndrome
- G47.36 Sleep related hypoventilation in conditions classified elsewhere
- G47.37 Central sleep apnea in conditions classified elsewhere
- G47.39 Other sleep apnea

===== G47.4 Narcolepsy and cataplexy =====
- G47.41 Narcolepsy
  - G47.411 ...... with cataplexy
  - G47.419 ...... without cataplexy
- G47.42 Narcolepsy in conditions classified elsewhere
  - G47.421 ...... with cataplexy
  - G47.429 ...... without cataplexy

===== G47.5 Parasomnia =====
- G47.50 ...... unspecified
- G47.51 Confusional arousals
- G47.52 REM sleep behavior disorder
- G47.53 Recurrent isolated sleep paralysis
- G47.54 ...... in conditions classified elsewhere
- G47.59 Other parasomnia

===== G47.6 Sleep related movement disorders =====
- G47.61 Periodic limb movement disorder
- G47.62 Sleep related leg cramps
- G47.63 Sleep related bruxism
- G47.69 Other sleep related movement disorders

==== F51 Sleep disorders not due to a substance or known physiological condition ====
===== F51.0 Insomnia not due to a substance or known physiological condition =====
- F51.01 Primary insomnia
- F51.02 Adjustment insomnia
- F51.03 Paradoxical insomnia
- F51.04 Psychophysiologic insomnia
- F51.05 Insomnia due to other mental disorder
- F51.09 Other insomnia not due to a substance or known physiological condition

===== F51.1 Hypersomnia not due to a substance or known physiological condition =====
- F51.11 Primary hypersomnia
- F51.12 Insufficient sleep syndrome
- F51.13 Hypersomnia due to other mental disorder
- F51.19 Other hypersomnia not due to a substance or known physiological condition

==== P28.3 ====
Applicable To

- Central sleep apnea of newborn
- Obstructive sleep apnea of newborn
- Sleep apnea of newborn NOS

Approximate Synonyms

- Neonatal primary apnea
- Primary apnea in the newborn
- Sleep apnea, primary, neonatal

=== ICD-11-Beta - 10 Sleep Wake Disorder 2016 ===
==== Insomnia disorders ====
- 8A00 Chronic insomnia
- 8A01 Short-term insomnia
- 8A02 Disorders of initiating and maintaining sleep
- 8A0Y Other specified insomnia disorders
- 8A0Z Insomnia disorders, unspecified

==== Sleep-related movement disorders ====
- 8A10 Restless legs syndrome
- 8A11 Secondary restless legs syndrome
- 8A12 Periodic limb movements disorder
- 8A13 Sleep-related bruxism
- 8A14 Sleep-related leg cramps
- 8A15 Sleep-related rhythmic movement disorder
- 8A16 Benign sleep myoclonus of infancy
- 8A1Y Other specified sleep-related movement disorders
- 8A1Z Sleep-related movement disorders, unspecified

==== 8A20 Hypersomnolence disorders ====
- 8A20.1 Narcolepsy, Type 1
- 8A20.2 Narcolepsy, Type 2
- 8A20.3 Idiopathic hypersomnolence disorder
- 8A20.4 Kleine-Levin syndrome
- 8A20.5 Behaviourally induced hypersomnolence
- 8A20.6 Hypersomnolence due to substances including medications
- 8A20.Y Other specified hypersomnolence disorders
- 8A20.Z Hypersomnolence disorders, unspecified

==== Sleep-related breathing disorders ====
- 8A30 Central sleep apnoeas
- 8A31 Obstructive sleep apnoea
- 8A32 Sleep-related hypoventilation or hypoxemia disorders
- 8A3Y Other specified sleep-related breathing disorders
- 8A3Z Sleep-related breathing disorders, unspecified

==== Circadian rhythm sleep-wake disorders ====
- 8A40 Circadian rhythm sleep-wake disorder, delayed type
- 8A41 Circadian rhythm sleep-wake disorder, advanced type
- 8A42 Circadian rhythm sleep-wake disorder, irregular sleep-wake rhythm type
- 8A43 Circadian rhythm sleep-wake disorder, non-24 hour type
- 8A44 Circadian rhythm sleep-wake disorder, shift work type
- 8A45 Circadian rhythm sleep-wake disorder, jet lag type
- 8A4Y Other specified circadian rhythm sleep-wake disorders
- 8A4Z Circadian rhythm sleep-wake disorders, unspecified

==== Parasomnia disorders ====
===== Disorders of arousal in non-REM sleep =====
- 8A50 Confusional arousals
- 8A51 Sleepwalking disorder
- 8A52 Sleep terrors
- 8A5Y Other specified disorders of arousal in non-REM sleep
- 8A5Z Disorders of arousal in non-REM sleep, unspecified
- 8A60 Sleep-related eating disorder

===== 8A61 REM sleep behavior disorder =====
- 8A62 Recurrent isolated sleep paralysis
- 8A63 Nightmare disorder 8A63 Nightmare disorder
- 8A64 Hypnogogic exploding head syndrome
- 8A65 Recurrent isolated sleep-related hallucinations

===== 8A66 Parasomnia disorder due to substances including medications =====
- 8A6Y Other specified parasomnia disorders
- 8A6Z Parasomnia disorders, unspecified
- 7B60.1 Nocturnal enuresis
- 8A70 Disorders of the sleep-wake schedule
- 8A71 Parasomnia
- 8A72 Sleeptalking
- 8A7Y Other specified sleep-wake disorders
- 8A7Z Sleep-wake disorders, unspecified
- ME21 Dyssomnia

== DSM Classification of Sleep Disorders ==
- Diagnostic and Statistical Manual (DSM) classification of sleep disorder was first introduced in 1968.

=== DSM II - 1968 ===
- Disorders of Sleep

=== DSM III - 1980 ===
- Other disorders with physical manifestation
  - Sleep walking
  - Sleep terror

=== DSM III-R 1987 ===
==== Sleep Disorder ====
===== Dysomnias (disorders of amount, quality or time of sleep) =====
- Insomnia
- Hypersomnia
- Sleep wake schedule disorder

===== Parasomnia (abnormal event during sleep) =====
- Nightmare disorder
- Sleep terror
- Sleep walking

=== DSM IV TR Sleep Disorders ===
| ICD-9 | Sleep Disorders |
| | Primary Sleep Disorders |
|---|---|
| | ==== Dyssomnias ==== |
| 307.42 | ===== Primary Insomnia ===== |
| 307.44 | ===== Primary Hypersomnia Specify if Recurrent ===== |
| 347.00 | ===== Narcolepsy ===== |
| 780.59 | ===== Breathing-Related Sleep Disorder ===== |
| 307.45 | ===== Circadian Rhythm Sleep Disorder ===== |
| 327.31 | Circadian Rhythm Sleep Disorder, Delayed Sleep Phase Type |
| 327.35 | Circadian Rhythm Sleep Disorder, Jet Lag Type |
| 327.36 | Circadian Rhythm Sleep Disorder, Shift Work Type |
| 327.30 | Circadian Rhythm Sleep Disorder, Unspecified Type |
| 307.47 | Dyssomnia NOS |
| | ==== Parasomnias ==== |
| 307.47 | Nightmare Disorder |
| 307.46 | Sleep Terror Disorder |
| 307.46 | Sleepwalking Disorder |
| 307.47 | Parasomnia NOS |
| | ==== Sleep disorders related to another mental disorder ==== |
| 307.42 | Insomnia Related to ... [Indicate the Axis I or Axis II Disorder] |
| 307.44 | Hypersomnia Related to ... [Indicate the Axis I or Axis II Disorder] |
| | ==== Other Sleep disorders ==== |
| 327.14 | Sleep Disorder Due to ... [Indicate the General Medical Condition], Hypersomnia Type |
| 327.01 | Sleep Disorder Due to ... [Indicate the General Medical Condition], Insomnia Type |
| 327.8 | Sleep Disorder Due to ... [Indicate the General Medical Condition], Mixed Type |
| 327.44 | Sleep Disorder Due to ... [Indicate the General Medical Condition], Parasomnia Type |
| 291.82 | Alcohol-Induced Sleep Disorder |
| 292.85 | Amphetamine-Induced Sleep Disorder |
| 292.85 | Caffeine-Induced Sleep Disorder |
| 292.85 | Cocaine-Induced Sleep Disorder |
| 292.85 | Opioid-Induced Sleep Disorder |
| 292.85 | Other (or Unknown) Substance-Induced Sleep Disorder |

=== DSM-5 Sleep Wake Disorders ===
==== Major changes from DSM IV ====
Sleep-wake disorders comprise 11 diagnostic groups:

1. M00 Insomnia disorder
2. M01 Hypersomnolence Disorder
3. M02 Narcolepsy/Hypocretin Deficiency
4. M03 Obstructive Sleep Apnea Hypopnea Syndrome
5. M04 Central Sleep Apnea
6. M05 Sleep-Related Hypoventilation
7. M06 Circadian Rhythm Sleep-Wake Disorder
8. M07 Disorder of Arousal
9. M08 Nightmare Disorder
10. M09 Rapid Eye Movement Sleep Behavior Disorder
11. M10 Restless Legs Syndrome
12. M11 Substance-Induced Sleep disorder
13. Sleep-Wake Disorders Not Elsewhere Classified
14. Insomnia Disorder Not Elsewhere Classified
15. Major Somnolence Disorder (Hypersomnia Not Elsewhere Classified) The following specifiers apply to Sleep-Wake Disorders where indicated: Specify if: Episodic, Persistent, Recurrent Specify if: Acute, Subacute, Persistent Specify current severity: Mild, Moderate, Severe

| ICD9-CM | ICD10-CM | DSM 5 |
|---|---|---|
| | | ==== Insomnia disorder ==== |
| 780.52 | G47.00 | Insomnia disorder Specify if: With non-sleep disorder mental comorbidity. With other Medical comorbidity. With other sleep disorder |
| 780.52 | G47.09 | Other specified insomnia disorder |
| 780.52 | G47.00 | Unspecified insomnia disorder |
| 780.54 | G47.10 | ==== Hypersomnolence disorder ==== Specify if: With mental disorder. With medical condition. With another sleep disorder |
| 780.54 | G47.19 | Other specified hypersomnolence disorder |
| 780.54 | G47.10 | Unspecified hypersomnolence disorder |
| | | ==== Narcolepsy ==== |
| 347.00 | G47.419 | Autosomal dominant cerebellar ataxia, deafness, and narcolepsy |
| 347.00 | G47.419 | Autosomal dominant narcolepsy, obesity, and type 2 diabetes |
| 347.00 | G47.419 | Narcolepsy without cataplexy but with hypocretin deficiency |
| 347.01 | G47.411 | Narcolepsy with cataplexy but without hypocretin deficiency |
| 347.10 | G47.429 | Narcolepsy secondary to another medical condition |
| | | ==== Breathing-Related Sleep Disorders ==== |
| 327.23 | G47.33 | ===== Obstructive sleep apnea hypopnea ===== |
| | | ===== Central sleep apnea ===== |
| 780.57 | G47.37 | Central sleep apnea comorbid with opioid use |
| 327.21 | G47.31 | Idiopathic central sleep apnea: |
| 786.04 | R06.3 | Cheyne-Stokes breathing |
| 780.57 | G47.37 | Central sleep apnea comorbid with opioid use Note: First code opioid use disorder, if present. Specify current severity |
| | | ===== Sleep-related hypoventilation ===== |
| 327.24 | G47.34 | Idiopathic hypoventilation |
| 327.25 | G47.35 | Congenital central alveolar hypoventilation |
| 327.26 | G47.36 | Comorbid sleep-related hypoventilation |
| | | ===== Primary Alveolar Hypoventilation ===== |
| | | ==== Circadian rhythm sleep-wake disorders ==== |
| 307.45 | G47.22 | Circadian rhythm sleep-wake disorders, Advanced sleep phase type |
| 307.45 | G47.21 | Circadian rhythm sleep-wake disorders, Delayed sleep phase type |
| 307.45 | G47.23 | Circadian rhythm sleep-wake disorders, Irregular sleep-wake type |
| 307.45 | G47.24 | Circadian rhythm sleep-wake disorders, Non-24-hour sleep-wake type |
| 307.45 | G47.26 | Circadian rhythm sleep-wake disorders, Shift work type |
| 307.45 | G47.20 | Circadian rhythm sleep-wake disorders, Unspecified type |
| | | ==== Non–rapid eye movement (NREM) sleep arousal disorders ==== |
| 307.46 | F51.4 | Non-rapid eye movement sleep arousal disorders, Sleep terror type |
| 307.46 | F51.3 | Non-rapid eye movement sleep arousal disorders, Sleepwalking type |
| | | Nightmare disorder |
| 307.47 | F51.5 | Nightmare disorder |
| 327.42 | G47.52 | ==== Rapid eye movement (REM) sleep behavior disorder ==== |
| 333.94 | G25.81 | Restless legs syndrome |
| | | ==== Medication-induced sleep disorder ==== |
| 291.82 | | Alcohol-induced sleep disorder |
| 292.85 | | Amphetamine (or other stimulant)-induced sleep disorder |
| 292.85 | | Caffeine-induced sleep disorder |
| 292.85 | | Cannabis-induced sleep disorder |
| 292.85 | | Cocaine-induced sleep disorder |
| 292.85 | | Opioid-induced sleep disorder |
| 292.85 | | Other (or unknown) substance-induced sleep disorder |
| 292.85 | | Sedative-, hypnotic-, or anxiolytic-induced sleep disorder |
| 292.85 | | Tobacco-induced sleep disorder |
| 780.54 | G47.19 | Other Specified Hypersomnolence Disorder |
| 780.54 | G47.10 | Unspecified Hypersomnolence Disorder |
| | | ==== Disorder of Arousal ==== |
| | | Confusional Arousals |
| | | Sleepwalking |
| | | Sleep terrors |
| 780.59 | G47.8 | ==== Other specified sleep-wake disorder ==== |
| 780.59 | G47.9 | ==== Unspecified sleep-wake disorder ==== |
