= International Classification of Sleep Disorders =

Coding resource for sleep and sleep-related disorders

International Classification of Sleep Disorder
- Specialty: Sleep medicine

The International Classification of Sleep Disorders (ICSD) is "a primary diagnostic, epidemiological and coding resource for clinicians and researchers in the field of sleep and sleep medicine". The ICSD was produced by the American Academy of Sleep Medicine (AASM) in association with the European Sleep Research Society, the Japanese Society of Sleep Research, and the Latin American Sleep Society. The classification was developed as a revision and update of the Diagnostic Classification of Sleep and Arousal Disorders (DCSAD) that was produced by both the Association of Sleep Disorders Centers (ASDC) and the Association for the Psychophysiological Study of Sleep and was published in the journal Sleep in 1979. A second edition, called ICSD-2, was published by the AASM in 2005. The third edition, ICSD-3, was released by the AASM in 2014. A text revision of the third edition (ICSD-3-TR) was published in 2023 by the AASM.

== Milestones of sleep disorder classifications ==
Year	ICSD	ICD	DSM
1974			DSM-III
1975		ICD-9	
1979	Nosology		
1980		ICD-CM	DSM-III
1987			DSM-III-R
1991	ICSD		
1992		ICD-10	
1994			DSM-IV
1997	ICSD-R		
2000			DSM-IV-TR
2005	ICSD-2		
2006	ICSD-2 Pocket Version		
2010		ICD-10-CM	
2014	ICSD-3		DSM-5
2015		ICD-11 Beta	
2022		ICD-11	
2023	ICSD-3-TR		DSM-5-TR

== Introduction ==
In 1979, the first Diagnostic Classification of Sleep and Arousal Disorders (DCSAD) was developed by the Association of Sleep Disorders Centers (ASDC) and the Association for the Psychophysiological Study of Sleep. Disorders were divided into four main categories.

1. Disorders of initiating and maintaining sleep (DIMS) – Insomnias
2. Disorders of Excessive somnolence (DOES) – Hypersomnias
3. Disorders of the Sleep-Wake Schedule – Circadian Disorders
4. Dysfunctions Associated with Sleep, Sleep Stages, or Partial Arousals – Parasomnias

In 1990, the first comprehensive classification of disorders of sleep and arousal, the International Classification of Sleep Disorders (ICSD-1990), was developed by the American Academy of Sleep Medicine (AASM) in association with the European Sleep Research Society, the Japanese Society of Sleep Research, and the Latin American Sleep Society. 84 sleep disorders were inventoried, based on pathophysiological characteristics. It was later revised as the ICSD-R in 1997.

The International Classification of Sleep Disorders (ICSD) uses a multiaxial system for stating and coding diagnoses both in clinical reports or for database purposes. The axial system uses International Classification of Diseases (ICD-9-CM) coding wherever possible. Additional codes are included for procedures and physical signs of particular interest to sleep disorders clinicians and researchers. Diagnoses and procedures are listed and coded on three main "axes". The axial system is arranged as follows:

Axis A ICSD Classification of Sleep Disorders

Axis B ICD-9-CM Classification of Procedures

Axis C ICD-9-CM Classification of Diseases (nonsleep diagnoses).

== ICSD-I (1990) and ICSD-Revised (1997) ==
1. Dyssomnias
  1. Intrinsic Sleep Disorders
  2. Extrinsic Sleep Disorders
  3. Circadian Rhythm Sleep Disorders
2. Parasomnias
  1. Arousal Disorders
  2. Sleep-Wake Transition Disorders
  3. Parasomnias Usually Associated with REM Sleep
  4. Other Parasomnias
3. Sleep Disorders Associated with Mental, Neurologic, or Other Medical Disorders
  1. Associated with Mental Disorders
  2. Associated with Neurologic Disorders
  3. Associated with Other Medical Disorders
4. Proposed Sleep Disorders
  1. Shorter Sleeper
  2. Long Sleeper
  3. Menstrual-Associated Sleep Disorders

== ICSD-2 ==
In 2005, the International Classification of Sleep Disorders underwent minor updates and modifications resulting in version 2 (ICSD-2).

ICSD-2	ICD-9-CM	ICD-10-CM
Insomnia: Insomnia is defined as the subjective perception of difficulty with sleep initiation, duration, consolidation, or quality that occurs despite adequate opportunity for sleep, and that results in some form of daytime impairment.
Adjustment sleep disorder (acute insomnia)	307.41	F 51.02
Psychophysiological insomnia	307.42	F 51.04
Paradoxical insomnia (formerly sleep state misperception)	307.42	F 51.03
Idiopathic insomnia	307.42	F 51.01
Insomnia due to mental disorder	307.42	F 51.05
Inadequate sleep hygiene	V69.4	Z72.821
Behavioral insomnia of childhood	307.42	—
Sleep-onset association type	—	z73.810
Limit-setting sleep type	—	z73.811
Combined type	—	Z73.812
Insomnia due to drug or substance	292.85	G47.02
Insomnia due to medical condition (code also the associated medical condition)	327.01	G47.01
Insomnia not due to a substance or known physiological condition, unspecified	780.52	F51.09
Physiological (organic) insomnia, unspecified; (organic insomnia, NOS)	327.00	G47.09
Sleep-Related Breathing Disorders:
Central sleep apnea syndromes
Primary central sleep apnea	327.21	G47.31
Central sleep apnea due to Cheyne-Stokes breathing pattern	768.04	R06.3
Central sleep apnea due to high altitude periodic breathing	327.22	G47.32
Central sleep apnea due to a medical condition, not Cheyne-Stokes	327.27	G47.31
Central sleep apnea due to a drug or substance	327.29	F10-19
Primary sleep apnea of infancy	770.81	P28.3
Obstructive sleep apnea syndromes
Obstructive sleep apnea, adult	327.23	G47.33
Obstructive sleep apnea, pediatric	327.23	G47.33
Sleep-related hypoventilation/hypoxemic syndromes
Sleep-related non-obstructive alveolar hypoventilation, bidiopathic	327.24	G47.34
Congenital central alveolar hypoventilation syndrome	327.25	G47.35
Sleep-related hypoventilation/hypoxemia due to a medical condition
Sleep-related hypoventilation/hypoxemia due to pulmonary parenchymal or vascular pathology	327.26	G47.36
Sleep-related hypoventilation/hypoxemia due to lower airways obstruction	327.26	G47.36
Sleep-related hypoventilation/hypoxemia due to neuromuscular or chest wall disorders	327.26	G47.36
Other sleep-related breathing disorder
Sleep apnea/sleep related breathing disorder, unspecified	320.20	G47.30
Hypersomnias of Central Origin:
Narcolepsy with cataplexy	347.01	G47.411
Narcolepsy without cataplexy	347.00	G47.419
Narcolepsy due to medical condition	347.10	G47.421
Narcolepsy, unspecified	347.00	G47.43
Recurrent hypersomnia	780.54	G47.13
Kleine-Levin Syndrome	327.13	G47.13
Menstrual-related hypersomnia	327.13	G47.13
Idiopathic hypersomnia with long sleep time	327.11	G47.11
Idiopathic hypersomnia without long sleep time	327.12	G47.12
Behaviorally induced insufficient sleep syndrome	307.44	F51.12
Hypersomnia due to medical condition	327.14	G47.14
Hypersomnia due to drug or substance	292.85	G47.14
Hypersomnia not due to a substance or known physiological condition	327.15	F51.1
Physiological (organic) hypersomnia, unspecified (organic hypersomnia, NOS)	327.10	G47.10
Circadian Rhythm Sleep Disorders:
Circadian rhythm sleep disorder, delayed sleep phase type	327.31	G47.21
Circadian rhythm sleep disorder, advanced sleep phase type	327.32	G47.22
Circadian rhythm sleep disorder, irregular sleep-wake type	327.33	G47.23
Circadian rhythm sleep disorder, free-running (non-entrained) type	327.34	G47.24
Circadian rhythm sleep disorder, jet lag type	327.35	G47.25
Circadian rhythm sleep disorder, shift work type	327.36	G47.26
Circadian rhythm sleep disorders due to medical condition	327.37	G47.27
Other circadian rhythm sleep disorder	327.39	G47.29
Other circadian rhythm sleep disorder due to drug or substance	292.85	G47.27
Parasomnias:
Disorders of arousal (from non-REM sleep)
Confusional arousals	327.41	G47.51
Sleepwalking	307.46	F51.3
Sleep terrors	307.46	F51.4
Parasomnias usually associated with REM sleep
REM sleep behavior disorder (including parasomnia overlap disorder and status dissociatus)	327.42	G47.52
Recurrent isolated sleep paralysis	327.43	G47.53
Nightmare disorder	307.47	F51.5
Other Parasomnias
Sleep-related dissociative disorders	300.15	F44.9
Sleep enuresis	788.36	N39.44
Sleep-related groaning (catathrenia)	327.49	G47.59
Exploding head syndrome	327.49	G47.59
Sleep-related hallucinations	368.16	R29.81
Sleep-related eating disorder	327.49	G47.59
Parasomnia, unspecified	227.40	G47.50
Parasomnia due to a drug or substance	292.85	G47.54
Parasomnia due to a medical condition	327.44	G47.54
Sleep-Related Movement Disorders:
Restless legs syndrome (including sleep-related growing pains)	333.49	G25.81
Periodic limb movement sleep disorder	327.51	G47.61
Sleep-related leg cramps	327.52	G47.62
Sleep-related bruxism	327.53	G47.63
Sleep-related rhythmic movement disorder	327.59	G47.69
Sleep-related movement disorder, unspecified	327.59	G47.90
Sleep-related movement disorder due to drug or substance	327.59	G47.67
Sleep-related movement disorder due to medical condition	327.59	G47.67
Isolated Symptoms, Apparently Normal Variants, and Unresolved Issues
Long sleeper	307.49	R29.81
Short sleeper	307.49	R29.81
Snoring	786.09	R06.83
Sleep talking	307.49	R29.81
Sleep starts, hypnic jerks	307.47	R25.8
Benign sleep myoclonus of infancy	781.01	R25.8
Hypnagogic foot tremor and alternating leg muscle activation during sleep	781.01	R25.8
Propriospinal myoclonus at sleep onset	781.01	R25.8
Excessive fragmentary myoclonus	781.01	R25.8
Other Sleep Disorders
Other physiological (organic) sleep disorder	327.8	G47.8
Other sleep disorder not due to a known substance or physiological condition	327.8	G47.9
Environmental sleep disorder	307.48	F51.8
Sleep disorders associated with conditions classifiable elsewhere
Fatal familial insomnia	046.8	A81.8
Fibromyalgia	729.1	M79.7
Sleep-related epilepsy	345	G40.5
Sleep-related headaches	784.0	R51
Sleep-related gastroesophageal reflux disease	530.1	K21.9
Sleep-related coronary artery ischemia	411.8	I25.6
Sleep-related abnormal swallowing, choking, and laryngospasm	787.2	R13.1
Other psychiatric/behavioral disorders frequently encountered in the differential diagnosis of sleep disorders
Mood disorders	—	—
Anxiety disorders	—	—
Somatoform disorders	—	—
Schizophrenia and other psychotic disorders	—	—
Disorders usually first diagnosed in infancy, childhood, or adolescence	—	—
Personality disorders	—	—

The ICSD-2 thus lists 81 sleep disorder diagnostic categories divided in 8 major categories. Each diagnostic is detailed in a description that presents the diagnostic criteria. The 81 diagnostics are divided into 8 main categories, namely insomnias, sleep-related breathing disorders, hypersomnias of central origin, circadian rhythm sleep disorders, parasomnias, sleep-related movement disorders, isolated symptoms apparently normal variants and unresolved issues, other sleep disorders. The two last categories (i.e. sleep disorders associated with disorders classified elsewhere and psychiatric disorders frequently encountered in the differential diagnosis of sleep disorders) are presented in the appendices and count 13 diagnostics.

In 2006, a pocket version of the ICSD-2 was released. In this version, a pediatric section was added listing the following diagnostic categories:

1. Behavioural Insomnia in Childhood
  1. Onset Type
  2. Limit Setting Type
2. Primary Sleep Apnea of Infancy
3. Obstructive Sleep Apnea, Pediatric
4. Congenital Central Alveolar Hypoventilation Syndrome
5. Sleep Enuresis
6. Restless Legs Syndrome
7. Sleep-related Rhythmic Movement Disorder

However, this classification brought some confusion into the field, which led to the revision of the classification in 2011. The classification was much more discussed by experts of the field and led to the third edition of the ICSD.

== ICSD-3 (2014) and ICSD-3-TR (2023) ==
The revision of the ICSD-2 was firstly made by the AASM and other International Societies. This revision integrates pediatric diagnosis into clinical adult diagnosis (except for obstructive sleep apnea) and led to the third edition of the ICSD, which was released in 2014.

ICSD-3 includes specific diagnoses within the seven major categories, as well as an appendix for classification of sleep disorders associated with medical and neurologic disorders. The International Classification of Diseases (ICD-9-CM and ICD-10-CM) codes corresponding to each specific diagnosis can be found within the ICSD-3. Furthermore, pediatric diagnoses are not distinguished from adult diagnoses except for sleep-related breathing disorders.

In addition, significant changes have been made in the nosology of insomnia, narcolepsy and parasomnia. Primary vs. secondary (i.e. comorbid) insomnia has been reunited into a single disorder: chronic insomnia. Narcolepsy has been divided into narcolepsy type 1 and narcolepsy type 2. These two types are distinguished by the presence or absence of cataplexy and the cerebrospinal fluid hypocretin-1 level. Concerning parasomnia, the sections have been modified, grouping together common features. Finally, a section on treatment-emerging CSA has been added to the CSA syndromes section.

It also discusses common isolated symptoms and normal variants. Some occur during normal sleep: as an example, sleep talking occurs at some time in most normal sleepers. Some lie on the continuum between normal and abnormal: as an example, snoring without associated airway compromise, sleep disturbance, or other consequences is essentially normal, whereas heavy snoring is often part of obstructive sleep apnea.

Furthermore, some features are no longer disorders and are reunited in The AASM [American Academy of Sleep Medicine] Manual for the Scoring of Sleep and Associated Events: Rules, Terminology and Technical Specifications. Therefore, ICSD permanently refers to this manual. The latter allows, for instance, to find definitions of polysomnography or specific features.

The ICSD-3 counts 383 pages for 83 disorders. It is divided into 7 main categories:

=== 1. Insomnia ===
1. Chronic insomnia disorder
2. Short-term insomnia disorder
3. Other insomnia (when the patient has insomnia symptoms but does not meet criteria for the other two types of insomnia)

=== 2. Sleep-related breathing disorders ===
==== Obstructive sleep apnea (OSA) syndromes ====
1. OSA, adult
2. OSA, pediatric

==== Central sleep apnea syndromes ====
1. Central sleep apnea with Cheyne-Stokes breathing
2. Central sleep apnea due a medical disorder without Cheyne-Stokes breathing
3. Central sleep apnea due to high altitude periodic breathing
4. Central sleep apnea due to a medication or substance
5. Primary central sleep apnea
6. Primary central sleep apnea of infancy
7. Primary central sleep apnea of prematurity
8. Treatment-emergent central sleep apnea

==== Sleep-related hypoventilation disorders ====
1. Obesity hypoventilation syndrome
2. Congenital central alveolar hypoventilation syndrome
3. Late-onset central hypoventilation with hypothalamic dysfunction
4. Idiopathic central alveolar hypoventilation
5. Sleep-related hypoventilation due to a medication or substance
6. Sleep-related hypoventilation due to a medical disorder

==== Sleep-related hypoxemia disorder ====
===== Isolated symptoms and normal variants =====
1. Snoring
2. Catathrenia

=== 3. Central disorders of hypersomnolence ===
1. Narcolepsy type 1
2. Narcolepsy type 2
3. Idiopathic hypersomnia
4. Kleine-Levin syndrome
5. Hypersomnia due to a medical disorder
6. Hypersomnia due to a medication or substance
7. Hypersomnia associated with a psychiatric disorder
8. Insufficient sleep syndrome

=== 4. Circadian rhythm sleep-wake disorders ===
1. Delayed sleep-wake phase disorder
2. Advanced sleep-wake phase disorder
3. Irregular sleep-wake rhythm disorder
4. Non-24-hour sleep-wake rhythm disorder
5. Shift work disorder
6. Jet lag disorder
7. Circadian sleep-wake disorder not otherwise specified

=== 5. Parasomnias ===
==== NREM-related parasomnias ====
1. Confusional arousals
2. Sleepwalking
3. Sleep terrors
4. Sleep-related eating disorder

==== REM-related parasomnias ====
1. REM sleep behavior disorder
2. Recurrent isolated sleep paralysis
3. Nightmare disorder

==== Other parasomnias ====
1. Exploding head syndrome
2. Sleep-related hallucinations
3. Sleep enuresis
4. Parasomnia due to a medical disorder
5. Parasomnia due to a medication or substance
6. Parasomnia, unspecified

==== Isolated symptoms and normal variants ====
1. Sleep talking

=== 6. Sleep-related movement disorders ===
1. Restless legs syndrome
2. Periodic limb movement disorder
3. Sleep-related leg cramps
4. Sleep-related bruxism
5. Sleep-related rhythmic movement disorder
6. Benign sleep myoclonus of infancy
7. Propriospinal myoclonus at sleep onset
8. Sleep-related movement disorder due to a medical disorder
9. Sleep-related movement disorder due to a medication or substance
10. Sleep-related movement disorder, unspecified

==== Isolated symptoms and normal variants ====
1. Excessive fragmentary myoclonus
2. Hypnagogic foot tremor and alternating leg muscle activation
3. Sleep starts (hypnic jerks)

=== 7. Other sleep disorders ===
Other sleep-related symptoms or events that do not meet the standard definition of a sleep disorder.

In 2023, the AASM revised the third edition with the International Classification of Sleep Disorders, third edition, text revision (ICSD-3-TR).

=== See also ===
- Classification of sleep disorders
- Chronotypes
- Noise health effects
- Polysomnography
- Polysomnographic technician
- Reversed vegetative symptoms
- Sleep hygiene
- Sleep medicine
- Sleep study
- Sundowning (dementia)
- White noise machine
