= Kleine–Levin syndrome =

Rare neurological disorder

- Other names: Familial hibernation syndrome; Sleeping Beauty Syndrome
- Specialty: Neurology
- Frequency: 0.0005%

Kleine–Levin syndrome (KLS) is a rare neurological disorder characterized by persistent episodic hypersomnia accompanied by cognitive and behavioral changes. These changes may include disinhibition (failure to inhibit actions or words), sometimes manifested through hypersexuality, hyperphagia or emotional lability, and other symptoms, such as derealization. Patients generally experience recurrent episodes of the condition for more than a decade, which may return at a later age. Individual episodes generally last more than a week, sometimes lasting for months. The condition greatly affects the personal, professional, and social lives of those with KLS. The severity of symptoms and the course of the syndrome vary between those with KLS. Patients commonly have about 20 episodes over about a decade. Several months may elapse between episodes.

The onset of the condition usually follows a viral infection (72% of patients); several different viruses have been observed to trigger KLS. It is generally only diagnosed after similar conditions have been excluded; MRI, CT scans, lumbar puncture, and toxicology tests are used to rule out other possibilities. The syndrome's mechanism is not known, but the thalamus is thought to possibly play a role. SPECT has shown thalamic hypoperfusion in patients during episodes.

KLS is very rare, occurring at a rate of 1 in 500,000, which limits research into genetic factors. The condition primarily affects teenagers (81% of reported patients), with a bias towards males (68–72% of cases), though females can also be affected, and the age of onset varies. There is no known cure and little evidence supporting drug treatment. Lithium has been reported to have limited effects in case reports, decreasing the length of episodes and increasing the duration between them in some patients. Stimulants have been shown to promote wakefulness during episodes, but they do not counteract cognitive symptoms or decrease the duration of episodes. The condition is named after Willi Kleine and Max Levin, who described cases of the disease in the early 20th century. It was added to the International Classification of Sleep Disorders in 1990.

== Symptoms and signs ==
Patients with Kleine–Levin syndrome (KLS) experience recurring episodes of prolonged sleep (hypersomnia). In most cases, patients sleep 15 to 21 hours a day during episodes. Excessive appetite (hyperphagia) and unusual cravings are present in half to two-thirds of cases. About half of patients, mainly male patients, experience dramatically increased sexual urges (hypersexuality). Several other symptoms usually accompany the syndrome, including marked changes in mood and cognitive ability. Derealization and severe apathy are present in at least 80 percent of cases. About one third of patients experience hallucinations or delusions. Depression and anxiety occur less commonly; one study found them in about 25 percent of patients. Individuals usually cannot remember what happened during episodes. Repetitive behaviors and headaches are commonly reported. Some patients act very childlike during episodes, and communication skills and coordination sometimes worsen.

Sleep studies of KLS show varying results based on the period the patient is observed. Slow wave sleep is often reduced at the beginning of episodes, and REM sleep is reduced near the end. Conversely, REM sleep is often normal at the beginning; slow wave sleep is often normal by the conclusion. Stage two non-rapid eye movement sleep is often interrupted during KLS. Studies also show that stage one and three non-rapid eye movement sleep becomes more efficient when the episodes end. The Multiple Sleep Latency Test has yielded inconsistent results when given to KLS patients. In many cases, hours are spent in a withdrawn sleep-like state while awake during episodes. Most sleep studies have been performed while the subject is near the end of their episodes. Some patients experience brief insomnia and become very happy and talkative after the episode ends.

The first time a patient experiences KLS, it usually occurs along with symptoms similar to those of the flu or encephalitis. In at least 75 percent of cases, symptoms occur after an airway infection or a fever. Viruses observed before the development of the condition include Epstein–Barr virus, varicella zoster virus, herpes zoster virus, influenza A virus subtypes, and adenovirus. Several days after symptoms first occur, patients become very tired. In cases after an infection, KLS usually starts within three to five days for teenagers and fewer for children. In other cases, alcohol consumption, head injury, or international travel precede symptoms. Lifestyle habits such as alcohol abuse, lack of sleep and stress have also been proposed as possible triggers. First episodes of KLS are preceded by a clear event in about 90 percent of cases. Recurrences generally do not have clear triggers; only about 15 percent have a precipitating event.

The condition generally disrupts the social lives and academic or professional obligations of those with KLS. Some patients also gain weight during episodes. The most severe cases cause a long-term impact on mood and cognitive attention. In rare cases, patients experience long-term memory problems.

In patients with KLS, MRI and CT scans show normal brain morphology. When SPECT is performed, hypoperfusion can often be observed in the brain, particularly in the thalamic and frontotemporal areas. The hypoperfusion is significantly diminished between episodes. Serum biology, c-reactive proteins and leptins, the hormonal pituitary axis, and protein in the cerebral spinal fluid (CSF) are normal in KLS patients.

== Cause ==
It is not known what causes KLS, but several mechanisms have been proposed. One possible explanation is hypothalamic or circadian dysfunction. The thalamus probably plays a role in the out-of-control sleeping, and patients with diencephalic–hypothalamic dysfunction caused by tumors experience symptoms similar to those of KLS patients. Specifically, the medial temporal regions of the thalamus may be involved, although examinations of KLS patients have not consistently found abnormalities in this area. The temporal lobe also appears to play a role in the condition, possibly causing cognitive difficulties. The apathy and disinhibition found in some with KLS suggest that the condition may include frontal lobe dysfunction as well. The involvement of the brain's thalamus, temporal lobe, and frontal lobe suggests a multifocal, localized encephalopathy. There are also persistent subclinical abnormalities in some with KLS.

Another possible explanation concerns the metabolism of serotonin and dopamine. An imbalance in the neurotransmitter pathways of these chemicals could play a role. Viral infections have also been suggested as a possible cause. Evidence for their role includes lesions found in autopsies. CSF samples from KLS patients indicate that the condition has a different cause than influenza-associated encephalopathy. Triggers of KLS may also affect the blood-brain barrier, which could play a role in the condition. There is limited evidence of what role hypocretin may play, although it often influences hypersomnia.

Androgen might (indirectly) block melatonin receptors, possibly through vasodilation, and cause cholinergic abnormalities in some cases of Kleine–Levin syndrome.

Because KLS occurs at a much higher rate in Jews and some families, there is likely some genetic component in addition to environmental factors. Genetic studies hold promise for understanding the disease, but they have yielded inconsistent results and few patients are available for testing.

Epilepsy and depression do not appear to cause KLS. The condition's rapid onset after infections indicates that the immune system is not to blame.

One study has suggested a link to the gene LMOD3 on chromosome 3.

== Diagnosis ==
KLS can be diagnosed when there is confusion, apathy, derealization, and frequent bouts of extreme tiredness and prolonged sleep. The earliest it can be diagnosed is the second episode, but this is not common. The condition is generally treated as a diagnosis of exclusion. Because KLS is rare, other conditions with similar symptoms are usually considered first.

MRIs can determine if the symptoms are caused by certain brain disorders, stroke, and multiple sclerosis. Lumbar puncture can determine if encephalitis is the cause. KLS must be differentiated from substance abuse by toxicology tests. The use of electroencephalography (EEG) can exclude temporal status epilepticus from consideration. EEGs are normal in about 70% of KLS patients, but background slowing may sometimes be detected. In addition, low-frequency high-amplitude waves can be observed during waking hours.

Initially, KLS appears similar to bipolar depression. Patients with frontal-lobe syndromes and Klüver–Bucy syndrome also display similar symptoms, but these conditions can be differentiated by the presence of brain lesions. KLS should also be distinguished from very rare cases of menstruation-caused hypersomnia.

== Prevention ==
Lithium is the only drug that appears to have a preventive effect. In two studies of more than 100 patients, lithium helped prevent the recurrence of symptoms in 20% to 40% of cases. The recommended blood level of lithium for KLS patients is 0.8–1.2 mEq/ml. It is not known if other mood stabilizers affect the condition. Anti-depressants do not prevent recurrence.

== Treatment ==
Several drug therapies have been used on patients with KLS, but none of them have been subject to randomized controlled trials. A 2016 Cochrane Review concluded that "No evidence indicates that pharmacological treatment for Kleine–Levin syndrome is effective and safe".

In several cases, stimulants, including modafinil, have been reported to have a limited effect on patients, often alleviating sleepiness. They can cause behavioral problems, but they may pose fewer issues if used in older patients with mild symptoms. In some case reports, lithium has been reported to decrease the length of episodes and the severity of their symptoms and to increase the time between episodes. It has been reported to be effective in about 25 to 60 percent of cases. Its use carries the risk of side effects in the thyroid or kidneys. Antipsychotics and benzodiazepines can help alleviate psychotic and anxiety-related symptoms, respectively. Carbamazepine has been reported to be less effective than lithium but more effective than some drugs in its class. Electroconvulsive therapy is not effective and worsens symptoms.

KLS patients generally do not need to be admitted to hospitals. It is recommended that caregivers reassure them and encourage them to maintain sleep hygiene. It may also be necessary for patients to be prevented from putting themselves in dangerous situations, such as driving.

== Prognosis ==
The frequency of KLS episodes can vary from attacks one week in length occurring twice a year to dozens of episodes that follow each other in close succession. The median duration of KLS episodes is about ten days, but some last several weeks or months. A study of 108 patients found an average of 19 episodes over the duration of the disease. Another study found a median of 3.5 months between episodes. Outside of episodes, there is no disturbance in patients' sleep patterns, and they are generally asymptomatic. Patients do not experience the same symptoms in each episode.

About 80 percent of patients are adolescents when they first experience KLS. On some occasions, though, its first occurrence comes in childhood or adulthood. In most adolescent-onset patients, symptoms cease by the time they are 30 years old. A French study of 108 patients found a median duration of 13 years, while a review of 186 cases found a median duration of 8 years. Unusually young or old patients and those who experience hypersexuality tend to have a more severe course. Patients who initially have frequent attacks generally see the disease cease earlier than others. The condition spontaneously resolves, and the patient is considered to be cured if there have been no symptoms for six years.

== Epidemiology ==
Population-based studies of KLS have not been performed. Its prevalence is about 1 to 2 cases per million people, although recent studies conducted by a French research team point to a higher number of 3 per million people. It occurs most frequently among Jews in the US and Israel. First-degree relatives of people who have the syndrome are much more likely than the general population to have it, although only in about one percent of cases do family members contract it. About 68 to 72 percent of patients are male. Patients with the syndrome are more likely than the general population to have genetic disorders, and about a third of people with the syndrome encounter some form of birth difficulty. In a study of 186 older patients, about ten percent had preexisting psychiatric issues. One study found that about ten percent of patients had a neurological condition before KLS developed. The condition does not appear to occur most frequently in one season.

== History ==
In 1815, there was a report of a young man who showed excessive appetite and prolonged sleep after experiencing a fever; this may have been an early description of the condition. Another case with similar symptoms was described by Brierre de Boismont in 1862.

Five patients with symptoms of persistent sleepiness were described in detail in 1925 by Willi Kleine, a neurologist from Frankfurt. This report was followed four years later by details of a similar case by New York-based psychiatrist Max Levin. In 1935, Levin published information about several more cases, including one described by Kleine. Levin noted that some patients displayed an intense appetite and persistent tiredness. MacDonald Critchley, who first wrote about the condition in 1942, described 11 cases he had examined and reviewed 15 other published cases in a 1962 publication. In the report, which included patients he had examined in the Royal Navy during World War II, he observed that irritability and depersonalization often occurred while patients were awake. He named the condition Kleine–Levin syndrome and noted four common traits: hypersexuality, adolescent onset, spontaneous resolution, and compulsive eating. He believed the condition only affected males, but later studies showed some female patients. In the 1970s, several psychoanalytic and psychodynamic explanations for the condition were proposed. In 1980, a Hawaiian–Caucasian family was found in which nine family members had the condition.

Diagnostic criteria for KLS were established by Schmidt in 1990, and the International Classification of Sleep Disorders further refined them. KLS is classified as a sleep disorder, specifically one of recurrent hypersomnia. Before 2005, hyperphagia and hypersexuality were thought to occur in all cases. That was changed with the guidelines published that year, which noted that they did not always occur.

== Bibliography ==
- Arnulf, Isabelle; Rico, Thomas; Mignot, Emmanuel (2012). "Diagnosis, Disease Course, and Management of Patients with Kleine-Levin Syndrome". The Lancet Neurology. 11 (10): 918–28. doi:10.1016/S1474-4422(12)70187-4. PMID 22995695. S2CID 7636103.
- Arnulf, Isabelle; Zeitzer, J. M.; Farber, N.; Mignot, Emmanuel (2005). "Kleine–Levin Syndrome: a Systematic Review of 186 Cases in the Literature". Brain. 128 (12): 2763–76. doi:10.1093/brain/awh620. PMID 16230322.
- Billiard, Michel; Jaussent, Isabelle; Dauvilliers, Yves; Besset, Alain (2011). "Recurrent Hypersomnia: a Review of 339 Cases". Sleep Medicine Reviews. 15 (4): 247–57. doi:10.1016/j.smrv.2010.08.001. PMID 20970360.
- Frenette, Eric; Kushida, Clete (2009). "Primary Hypersomnias of Central Origin". Seminars in Neurology. 29 (4): 354–67. doi:10.1055/s-0029-1237114. PMID 19742411. S2CID 260318627.
- Gupta, Ravi; Lahan, Vivekananda; Srivastava, Malini (2011). "Kleine-Levin Syndrome and Idiopathic Hypersomnia: Spectrum Disorders". Indian Journal of Psychological Medicine. 33 (2): 194–98. doi:10.4103/0253-7176.92048. PMC 3271500. PMID 22345850.
- Huang, Yu-Shu; Lakkis, Clair; Guilleminault, Christian (2010). "Kleine-Levin Syndrome: Current Status". Medical Clinics of North America. 94 (3): 557–62. doi:10.1016/j.mcna.2010.02.011. PMID 20451032.
- Kodaira, Minori; Yamamoto, Kanji (2012). "First Attack of Kleine-Levin Syndrome Triggered by Influenza B Mimicking Influenza-associated Encephalopathy". Internal Medicine. 51 (12): 1605–8. doi:10.2169/internalmedicine.51.7051. PMID 22728499.
- Mignot, Emmanuel (2012). "A Practical Guide to the Therapy of Narcolepsy and Hypersomnia Syndromes". Neurotherapeutics. 9 (4): 739–52. doi:10.1007/s13311-012-0150-9. PMC 3480574. PMID 23065655.
- Pearce, J. M. (2008). "Kleine–Levin Syndrome: History and Brief Review". European Neurology. 60 (4): 212–4. doi:10.1159/000148694. PMID 18667831.
- Ramdurg, Santosh (2010). "Kleine–Levin Syndrome: Etiology, Diagnosis, and Treatment". Annals of Indian Academy of Neurology. 13 (4): 241–6. doi:10.4103/0972-2327.74185. PMC 3021925. PMID 21264130.
