= Catathrenia =

Abnormal, irregular groaning during sleep

- Specialty: Otorhinolaryngology, sleep medicine, Somnology
- Symptoms: groaning or moaning during sleep

Catathrenia or nocturnal groaning is a sleep-related breathing disorder, consisting of end-inspiratory apnea (breath holding) and expiratory groaning during sleep. It describes a rare condition characterized by monotonous, irregular groans while sleeping. Catathrenia begins with a deep inspiration. The person with catathrenia holds their breath against a closed glottis, similar to the Valsalva maneuver. Expiration can be slow and accompanied by a sound caused by the vibration of the vocal cords or a simple, rapid exhalation. Despite a slower breathing rate, no oxygen desaturation usually occurs. The moaning sound is usually not noticed by the person producing the sound, but it can be extremely disturbing to sleep partners. It appears more often during expiration REM sleep than in NREM sleep.

Catathrenia is distinct from both somniloquy (sleep talking) and obstructive sleep apnea (OSA). The sound is produced during exhalation, as opposed to snoring, which occurs during inhalation.

== Etymology ==
Catathrenia (from the Greek kata, meaning “below”, and threnia, meaning “to lament”).

== Classification ==
Catathrenia has been defined as a parasomnia in the International Classification of Sleep Disorders Diagnostic and Coding Manual (ICSD-2), but there is debate about its classification. Importantly, in the latest version of the International Classification of Sleep Disorders (ICSD-3), catathrenia has been included in the category of respiratory disorders, and thus it has been removed from the parasomnia category, as it was in the second version of the manual. Nevertheless, a debate about the nature and classification of the disorder still exists.

== Signs and symptoms ==
Catathrenia itself is not considered life-threatening.

Bed partners generally report hearing the person take a deep breath, hold it, then slowly exhale; often with a high-pitched squeak or groaning sound.

=== Common characteristics in reported cases ===
There are reported characteristics that are shared among patients with catathrenia. The main characteristics are:

- Vocal sound: Sounds are usually a short or long vocalisation of the same letter (mainly an [a], [e], [o] sound or something in between). Contrary to snoring which has only formants, catathrenia has also harmonics and show more regular and similar patterns between nights.
- Onset of groanings: Groanings tend to begin in childhood, adolescence or early adulthood. The ICSD-2 established the age of onset ranging from 5 to 36 years.
- Consistency from night to night.
- Appearing during expiration: The sounds show up exclusively on expiration and are interrupted during inspiration.
- Unawareness of the problem: Patients usually sleep normally despite the sounds and the effort to breathe. However, bed partners and entourage are on one hand disturbed by the emitted noises during their sleep and on the other hand concerned about the pathological meaning of the disease. The latter highlights the importance of reassuring entourage about the benignity of the disease.
- No predisposing factors: No clear predisposing factors or aetiology have been demonstrated.
- The duration of the groaning sound varies from two to 49 s.

There are a few other similarities amongst people with catathrenia that have not yet been studied properly:

- Many people with catathrenia mention that they also have some form of stress or anxiety in their lives.
- People with catathrenia themselves do not feel like they are experiencing a sleep apnea; the breath-holding appears to be controlled through the unconscious. Oxygen desaturation during a catathrenia episode is usually negligible.
- Many took part in sports activities during teens and twenties some which required breath-holding which included many types of sports such as swimming and even weight lifting. They find a certain level of comfort in breath-holding, and often do it while awake.
- Observations have been made of instances of breath holding during daily activities that require concentration.
- Some people with catathrenia recalled having lucid or stress dreams during their catathrenia episodes during their sleep.
- Some people with catathrenia complain of having a painful chest upon waking from sleep.

Certain side effects include sore throat, fatigue, and dizziness.

=== Discrepancies among reported cases ===
- Sound duration: The duration of the sound varies among patients. While the ISCD-2 established limits between 2 and 49 s, authors have described other ranges including short duration as of 0.5 s. Review of reported cases indicates two types of patients whose produced sound can either be short lasting (0.5 to 1.5 s) or longer lasting (2 to 20 s). Nonetheless, it is not clear if the sounds are in fact single long noises fragmented by brief expirations.
- Sound intensity: Patients show a large variability in sound intensity ranging from 40 dB to 120 dB. In addition, sounds can also be long and soft as well as short and loud.
- Onset time of the noise during the night: The ISCD-2 established latency of noises after falling asleep ranging from 2 to 6 h. However, in some published cases the onset time of the noises is reported as being shorter (3 min).
- Association with respiratory disorders.
- Response to continuous positive airway pressure (CPAP) treatment: The response to CPAP treatment partly depends on respiratory disorders. Patients with respiratory dysrhythmia may show poor to no improvements. CPAP in combination with drugs may also obtain unsatisfactory results. For other patients there is an excellent response to CPAP treatment (e.g., for young women patients with catathrenia over a 5-year period, patient with OSA and pulmonary hypertension, and others).
- Predominance of REM or NREM: Catathrenia typically, sometimes even exclusively, occurs during REM sleep, although it may also occur to a lesser degree during NREM sleep. The predominance of REM or NREM sleep during which noises occurs varies from patient to patient. For some cases, a REM predominance has been reported whereas it is the opposite for others. Other reports indicated that sounds may occur at any time during sleep.

== Epidemiology ==
It was in 1983 when the first case of catathrenia was described. The disorder is especially rare and many sleep specialists and otolaryngologists are still unfamiliar with this atypical sleep pattern. Catathrenia must be distinguished from moaning during epileptic seizures, central sleep apnea, sleep-related laryngospasm, snoring, and stridor. Since polysomnography alone is insufficient to correctly distinguish catathrenia from central sleep apnea, a video-polysomnography with audio recording is necessary to diagnose catathrenia and avoid mistakes. Despite the fact that the incidence of catathrenia might be underestimated due to misdiagnoses, an institution in Norway has found an incidence of 4 out of 1,004 (0.4%) among patients with sleep and/or wake problems over a 1-year period. A previous study in Japan found an incidence of 25 out of 15,052 (0.17%) among patients with sleep and/or wake problems over a 10-year period.

== Management ==
Sleeping in a more upright position seems to lessen catathrenia (as well as sleep apnea). Performing regular aerobic exercise, where steady breathing is necessary (running, cycling etc.) may lessen catathrenia. Strength exercise, on the other hand, may worsen catathrenia because of the tendency to hold one's breath while exercising. Yoga and/or meditation focused on steady and regular breathing may lessen catathrenia.

Some evidence indicates that continuous positive airway pressure can be an effective treatment for catathrenia: in a study, the subject using CPAP significantly decreased the sounds typically produced because of the disorder, which almost disappeared.

== Cause ==
The exact cause of catathrenia is still unknown; there is debate on whether the cause is physical or neurological.

== Other nocturnal vocalisation ==
Multiple studies have described nocturnal vocalisation among animals and have also reported some cases in humans, especially in patients with Parkinson's disease. The nocturnal vocalisation can be groaning, moaning, or different sounds produced while asleep, the most encountered being catathrenia and sleep talking.
