= Autosomal dominant cerebellar ataxia, deafness, and narcolepsy =

Autosomal dominant cerebellar ataxia, deafness and narcolepsy
- Other names: ADCADN, ADCA-DN, autosomal dominant cerebellar ataxia, deafness and narcolepsy, autosomal dominant cerebellar ataxia-deafness-narcolepsy syndrome, ADCA-DN syndrome.
- Specialty: Medical genetics, Neurology
- Causes: Genetic mutation
- Diagnostic method: Genetic testing
- Prevention: None
- Frequency: Very rare

Autosomal dominant cerebellar ataxia, deafness, and narcolepsy (ADCADN) is a rare progressive genetic disorder that primarily affects the nervous system and is characterized by sensorineural hearing loss, narcolepsy with cataplexy, and dementia later in life. People with this disorder usually start showing symptoms when they are in their early-mid adulthoods. It is a type of autosomal dominant cerebellar ataxia.

== Presentation ==
Usually, people with this disorder have ataxia, mild–moderate sensorineural hearing loss, narcolepsy, and cataplexy. These symptoms start happening when an affected person is about 30 years old.

A bit later in life, people with ADCADN start showing a decline in executive function known as dementia. Degeneration of the optic nerves, cataracts, sensory neuropathy, lymphedema of the arms and legs, urinary incontinence, depression, uncontrollable and inappropriate laughing or crying (e.g. sudden incontrollable laughing during a funeral), and psychosis are features that typically accompany it. People with this disorder only live to be 40–50 years old.

Other features of the disorder that may or may not occur in all patients include diabetes mellitus, spasticity, nystagmus, tremors, dilatation of the right ventricle, cerebral atrophy, and other generalized brain abnormalities.

== Genetics ==
This condition is caused by mutations in exon 20–21 of the DNMT1 gene, located in chromosome 19. These mutations are inherited in an autosomal dominant manner, meaning that for someone to show symptoms of a condition, they must have at least one copy of the mutation. This can occur in two scenarios; it can be hereditary or it can be the result of a spontaneous error.

This gene plays a role in the production of an enzyme called DNA methyltransferase 1, which is involved in DNA methylation. This enzyme is essential for the regulation of neuron maturation, differentiation, migration, and most importantly, survival. The mutations involved in ADCAN alter a certain region in the enzyme produced by the gene which helps DNA methylation, which ends up distorting said process. This affects the expression of various genes. This also disrupts neuron maintenance, leading to the characteristic psychiatric and cognitive symptoms of this condition.

== Diagnosis ==
This condition can be diagnosed by using methods such as whole exome sequencing and examination of the patient's symptoms.

== Prevalence ==
More than 80 cases from families around the world have been described in medical literature.

The following list comprises all countries of origin (according to OrphaNet):

- Sweden
- United States
- Italy
- Brazil
- China
- New Zealand
- Belgium
- United Kingdom
- Canada
- Germany
- Taiwan

== History ==
This condition was first discovered in 1995 by Melberg et al. when they described 5 members of a 4-generation Swedish family where cerebellar ataxia and sensorineural deafness presented as an autosomal dominant trait, 4 of them had narcolepsy and 2 had diabetes mellitus. The oldest members had psychiatric symptoms, neurological anomalies, and optic atrophy, showing the progressive nature of the condition.
