= Confusional arousal =

Episodic sleep disorder and parasomnia

A confusional arousal, also known as sleep drunkenness or severe sleep inertia, is medical condition where a person awakened from sleep shows mental confusion for at least several minutes. Complete or partial amnesia of the episodes may be present.

== Signs and symptoms ==
Confusional arousals are accompanied by mental confusion and disorientation, relative lack of response to environmental stimuli, and difficulty of awakening the subject. Vocalisation accompanied with coherent speech is common. Patients may appear upset, and some of them become aggressive or agitated. As well as for children, attempting to awaken or console an adult patient may increase agitation. Confusional arousals can occur during or following an arousal of deep sleep and upon an attempt of awakening the subject from sleep in the morning.

In children, confusional arousals can often be reproduced artificially by awakening the child during deep sleep. However, it does not have any clinical significance without deeper investigation. Children living an episode of confusional arousal typically sit up in bed, whimper, cry, moan, and may utter words like "no" or "go away". They remain distressed and inconsolable despite all parental efforts. Paradoxically, parental efforts can rather increase agitation of the child. The onset of symptoms is usually within 2 and 3 hours of sleep onset (at the time of transition from slow-wave sleep to a lighter sleep stage) and those events can last from 10 to 30 minutes. Patients generally wake up without any recollection of the event. It is necessary to distinguish confusional arousals in adults from children.

=== Neurological symptomatology ===
Confusional arousals are associated with behavioural awakening with persistent slow-wave electroencephalographic activity during non-rapid eye movement sleep (NREM). It suggests that sensorimotor network is activated while non sensorimotor areas are still "asleep". The altered state of consciousness may be explained by a hypersynchronous delta activity in network involving the frontoparietal cortices (suggesting to be "asleep"), and higher frequency activities in sensorimotor, orbitofrontal, and temporal lateral cortices (suggesting an "awakening").

=== Sleep-related violence and abnormal sexual behaviours ===
Confusional arousals have often been linked to sleep-related violence (self-injury or injury to the bed partner). The latter highlights important medical and legal issues when such behaviours are suspected and purported to have caused a criminal offense. The first documented case of homicide as a result of confusional arousal was reported in medieval times by the case of the Silesian woodcutter Bernard Schedmaizig. Sleep-related abnormal sexual behaviours (also called sexsomnia or sleep sex) are mainly classified as confusional arousals and more rarely associated to sleepwalking (also known as somnambulism). Even if sleep-related violence may occur during an episode of confusional arousal, it remains extremely rare and there is no specific predisposition to aggression during these episodes.

==== Distinction between sleepwalking and night terrors ====
Violent behaviours in confusional arousals slightly differ from those in sleepwalking or night terrors. Above all, during an episode of confusional arousal the patient never leaves the bed, unlike sleepwalking. A bed partner or parent who tries to calm or restrain the patient by grabbing him or her may trigger a violent reaction as with sleepwalkers. In case of a confusional arousal triggered by an attempt of awakening the patient, violent behaviours may occur almost spontaneously. Unlike confusional arousals and sleep walking, patients experiencing night terrors seem to react to some type of frightening image. Therefore, the violent reaction may occur if another individual is encountered or is in proximity.

== Classification ==
=== International Classification of Sleep Disorders (ICSD) ===
According to the second edition of the International Classification of Sleep Disorders (ICSD-2), confusional arousals are classified in NREM parasomnias embedded in the non-epileptic paroxysmal motor events during sleep, which include (1) parasomnia, (2) sleep-related movement disorders, and (3) isolated symptoms, apparently normal variants and unresolved issues. NREM parasomnias (or disorders of arousal) also include sleep terrors and sleepwalking. Confusional arousals are characterised by more or less complex movements without leaving bed with whimpering, sitting up in bed and some articulation without walking or terror. In comparison, of other arousal parasomnias the age onset of sleep walking is generally between 5 and 10 years whereas confusional arousals and sleep terror may occur 3 years earlier. Sleep terrors are mainly characterised by screaming, agitation, flushed face, sweating and only share the inconsolability with confusional arousals. The third edition of the International Classification of Sleep Disorders (ICSD-3) added the sleep-related eating disorders in the disorders of arousal from NREM sleep.

=== Diagnostic and Statistical Manual of Mental Disorders (DSM) ===
Confusional arousals are at the time not considered as a disorder in the fifth edition of the Diagnostic and Statistical Manual of Mental Disorders (DSM-V). This absence may be explained by the fact that confusional arousals have been understudied by the scientific community.

== Diagnosis ==
The evaluation "should include a comprehensive medical history, a physical, neurological, and developmental examination, and a detailed description of the nocturnal events, sleep-wake schedules, and daytime behaviour”. However, the episodes have a long duration and a low rate of same-night recurrence. Even if amnesia usually follows episodes of confusional arousal, it is not a distinct trait related to severity.

A video-polysomnography might be required if life history is untypical. In case of suspicion parents are encouraged to use infrared camera to record the behaviour of their child during sleep. Association of video recordings of nocturnal episodes with historical features is an important tool for both understanding and correctly diagnosing the disorder differently from other episodes of parasomnia. Confusional arousals as well as arousal parasomnias in general must be distinguished from epileptic seizure on the basis of clinical and electroencephalographic features.

== Management ==
Children mostly outgrow the condition by late adolescence if not sooner. Management includes mainly non-pharmacological treatments and daily behaviours guidelines, but may include safety measures and/or medications if the patient is in danger from his or her behaviour:

- Ensure regular and adequate sleep routines in order to prevent sleep-wake cycle to be disrupted.
- Use of safety measures for the patient and family by clearing the bedroom from obstacles, securing the windows, or installing locks or alarms.
- Medications are necessary if the patient is in danger from their behaviour. In this case, Imipramine or low-dose Clonazepam is beneficial.

== Epidemiology ==
The prevalence of confusional arousals varies according to the year and the sample population and is approximately 4%. It was 4.2% in 1999 in UK sample population, 6.1% (15–24 years old), 3.3% (25–34) and 2% (35+) in 2000 in the UK, Germany, and Italy sample population, and 6.9% in 2010 in Norway sample population with a lifetime prevalence of 18.5%. The prevalence of confusional arousals in children (3–13) is higher and around 17.3%. Confusional arousals without a known cause or associated condition is uncommon (for about 1% of cases).The contribution of genetics and family link is strong and episodes of confusional arousals can occur in several members of the same family.

=== Risk factors ===
Some independent risk factors associated with confusional arousals have been identified. According to studies, they are shift work, hypnagogic hallucinations (also known as hypnagogia), excessive daytime sleepiness, insomnia and hypersomnia disorder, circadian rhythm sleep disorder, restless legs syndrome, obstructive sleep apnea syndrome (OSAS), bipolar disorder, daily smoking, and age of 15–24 years. These risk factors of confusional arousals are somehow related to mental disorders and medical conditions and affecting mostly younger subjects regardless of gender. Precipitating factors include sleep deprivation, use of hypnotics or tranquilisers before bedtime, and sudden awakening from sleep (e.g., telephone ringing, alarm clock).

In the ICSD-2, alcohol intake had been considered as a precipitating factor of confusional arousals. In the ICSD-3, the relation between alcohol use and disorder or arousal have been excluded Moreover, the alcohol blackout has been added as a differential diagnosis. These changes have important implications for forensic cases.
