= Jean-Baptiste-Édouard Gélineau =

French physician

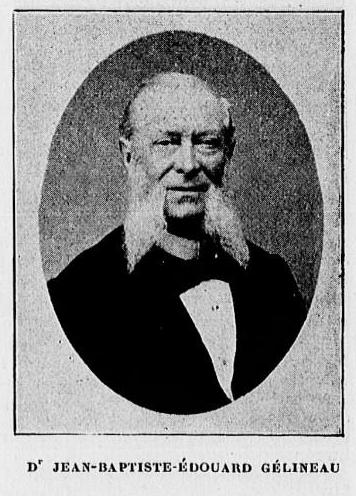
Jean-Baptiste-Édouard Gélineau

Jean-Baptiste-Édouard Gélineau (23 December 1828 – 2 March 1906) was the French physician and neuropsychiatrist who first described narcolepsy.

== Early life and education ==
Gélineau was born in Blaye, Gironde, and had a varied life. As a young student at the Rochefort Navy Medical School he took part in the combat against cholera, from which the city of La Rochelle was suffering. In 1849 he became an intern of the Navy Hospital and in the following year a "Surgeon of the Third Class".

== Career ==
As a naval surgeon he visited French colonies in the Indian Ocean: first Réunion island and then Mayotte in the Comoros archipelago. During this expedition he wrote a thesis on diseases prevalent among individuals of African and European descent in the Comorro Islands. He also wrote Voyage a i'lle de la Réunion, a memoir published much later, in 1905, in which he described colonial life and the abolition of slavery. He included the story of Elise, a beautiful Creole woman. She was the concubine of a young naval commander, and had a child who died soon after birth. This indicates the autobiographic character of the work.

He defended a doctoral thesis "Aperçu Medical de I'lle de Mayotte" at Montpellier University School of Medicine in 1858, using the data collected during his year-and-a-half stay on Mayotte. At that time he was a "Navy Surgeon of the Second Class".

For his dedication in fighting epidemics that broke out during the Franco-German war in 1870, he was nominated for the Legion of Honor, but received it later on. He also held the Officier d'Academie and Commander of Nichan of the Ottoman Empire.

In 1871, Gélineau introduced "Doctor Gélineau's Tablets" for the treatment of epilepsy (they contained bromide, antimony and arsenic). He was a member of the Société de Médicine, Société d' Hypnologie, La Société Française d' Hygiène, and a few others.

After retirement at the age of 72, Gélineau dedicating his time to the cultivation of vines and wine production, continuing the family tradition. He was awarded gold medals at exhibitions in Antwerp and Paris. He died, aged 77, in Argelès-Gazost, Pyrenees.
