= Sleep-talking =

Phenomenon of talking while asleep

Somniloquy, commonly referred to as sleep-talking, is a parasomnia in which one speaks aloud while asleep. It can range from simple mumbling sounds to loud shouts or long, frequently inarticulate speeches. It can occur many times during a sleep cycle and during both NREM and REM sleep stages, though, as with sleepwalking and night terrors, it most commonly occurs during delta-wave NREM sleep or temporary arousals therefrom.

When somniloquy occurs during rapid eye movement sleep, it represents a so-called "motor breakthrough" of dream speech: words spoken in a dream are spoken out loud. Depending on its frequency, this may or may not be considered pathological. All motor functions are disabled during healthy REM sleep and therefore REM somniloquy is usually considered a component of REM behavior disorder.

== Presentation ==
=== Associated conditions ===
Sleep-talking can occur by itself (i.e., idiopathic) or as a feature of another sleep disorder such as:

- Rapid eye movement behavior disorder (RBD) – loud, emotional or profane sleep talking
- Sleepwalking
- Night terrors – intense fear, screaming, shouting
- Sleep-related eating disorder (SRED)

== Causes ==
In 1966, researchers worked to find links between heredity and sleep-talking. Their research suggests the following:

- Sleep-talking parents are more likely to have children who sleep-talk.
- Sleep-talking can still occur, though much less commonly, when neither parent has a history of sleep talking.
- A large portion of people begin to sleep-talk later in life without any prior history of sleep-talking during childhood or adolescence.

Sleep-talking by itself is typically harmless; however, it can wake others and cause them consternation – especially when misinterpreted as conscious speech by an observer. If the sleep-talking is dramatic, emotional, or profane it may be a sign of another sleep disorder. Sleep-talking can be monitored by a partner or by using an audio recording device; devices which remain idle until detecting a sound are ideal for this purpose.

Polysomnography (sleep recording) shows that episodes of sleep talking can occur in any stage of sleep.

Stress can also cause sleep talking. In one study, about 30% of people who had PTSD (post-traumatic stress disorder) talk in their sleep. A 1990 study showed that Vietnam War veterans having PTSD report talking more in their sleep than do people without PTSD.

Sleep-talking can also be caused by depression, sleep deprivation, day-time drowsiness, alcohol, and fever. It often occurs in association with other sleep disorders such as confusional arousals, sleep apnea, and REM sleep behavior disorder. In rare cases, adult-onset sleep-talking is linked with a psychiatric disorder or nocturnal seizure.

== Prevalence ==
Sleep-talking is very common and is reported in 50% of young children at least once a year. A large percentage of people progressively sleep-talk less often after the age of 25. A sizable proportion of people without any episode during their childhood begin to sleep-talk in adult life. Sleep-talking may be hereditary.

In a study reporting the prevalence of sleep-talking in childhood, the authors reported that the frequency of sleep-talking differs between children. About half of the children have sleep-talking episodes at least once a year, but less than 10% of children present sleep-talking every night, whereas 20% to 25% talk in their sleep at least once a week. In addition, they did not find any difference between gender or socioeconomic class.

However, valid estimation of the prevalence of this phenomenon is difficult as the sleep-talker either does not remember or are not aware of their sleep-talking. The same uncertainty exists concerning the age of onset because early occurrences may have escaped notice. Thus, there are disparate results regarding its prevalence in the literature.

== Treatment ==
Usually, treatment is not required for sleep-talking because it generally does not disturb sleep or cause other problems.

One behavioral treatment has shown results in the past. Le Boeuf (1979) used an automated auditory signal to treat chronic sleep-talking in a person who had talked in his sleep for 6 years. An aversive sound was produced for 5 seconds when he started talking in his sleep. Sleep-talking was rapidly eliminated, and the person demonstrated no adverse effects of treatment. With little treatment options, there are ways in which one can limit the frequency of sleep talking episodes by focusing on sleep hygiene. Some tips include the following:

- Limiting caffeine intake throughout the day
- Putting electronics away within an hour before bedtime
- Keeping the bedroom at a cool temperature to make it more comfortable.
- Maintaining a regular bedtime schedule, waking and going to bed at the same time every day
- Getting physical exercise for at least an hour every day
- Having a space with limited distractions for sleeping

== In literature ==
Sleep-talking appears in Shakespeare's Macbeth, the famous sleepwalking scene. Lady Macbeth, in a "slumbery agitation", is observed by a gentlewoman and doctor to walk in her sleep and wash her hands, and utter the famous line, "Out, damned spot! out, I say!" (Act 5, Scene 1).

Sleep-talking also appears in The Childhood of King Erik Menved, a 19th-century historical romance by Danish author Bernhard Severin Ingemann. In the story, a young girl named Aasé has the prophetic power of speaking the truth in her sleep. In an 1846 English translation, Aasé is described thus:

She is somewhat palefaced; and, however blithe and sprightly she may be, she is, nevertheless, now and then troubled with a kind of dreaming fit. But that will wear off as she gets older. Her mother was so troubled before her; and I believe it runs in the family as I am not entirely free from it myself. I do not give much heed to such dreaming now; but she has never yet said anything, while in this state, that has not proved in a manner true; though she can discern nothing, by night or day, more than others may do when they are in their senses.

Walt Whitman wrote a now-lost novel based on Ingemann's romance, which he titled The Sleeptalker.

In Lewis Carroll's Alice's Adventure's in Wonderland, Chapter VII, The Dormouse talks in his sleep, or at least seems to, and even sings in his sleep:

'You might just as well say,' added the Dormouse, who seemed to be talking in his sleep, 'that "I breathe when I sleep" is the same thing as "I sleep when I breathe"!'

Here the Dormouse shook itself, and began singing in its sleep 'Twinkle, twinkle, twinkle, twinkle—' and went on so long that they had to pinch it to make it stop.

== See also ==
- Dion McGregor, noted 20th-century sleep-talker
- Sleep emailing
