= Impairment detection technology =

Impairment diagnostic technology

Impairment detection technology (IDT) refers to tools and systems designed to assess whether an individual is functionally impaired at a given moment, regardless of the cause. Unlike drug and alcohol tests that detect substances or their metabolites in the body, IDTs evaluate real-time cognitive or physical performance to identify active impairment. These systems are relevant where safety is critical, such as workplaces and law enforcement.

IDTs do not identify the specific cause of impairment, such as drug use, fatigue, or illness, but instead detect behavioral or physiological markers like slowed reaction time, poor coordination, or eye movement abnormalities.

Interest in IDT has increased as workplaces and law enforcement agencies address the limitations of traditional drug testing methods. The legalization of cannabis has underscored challenges associated with metabolite-based tests, which can yield positive results days after use, even when the individual is no longer impaired. Studies indicate that tetrahydrocannabinol (THC) levels in blood or saliva do not reliably correlate with functional impairment, as frequent users may retain high THC concentrations without experiencing intoxication, and metabolites may remain detectable long after psychoactive effects have ended.

== Types ==
IDTs assess an individual’s functional state in real time by monitoring cognitive performance or physiological responses. These technologies fall into several categories:

=== Oculomotor ===
These systems analyze involuntary eye movements and pupil responses, such as nystagmus or delayed reactions to detect impairment. Devices like Gaize’s VR headset use eye-tracking sensors and machine learning to detect intoxication based on ocular behavior.

=== Psychomotor ===
Digital tests measure reaction time, attention, and coordination to detect cognitive deficits due to fatigue or substances. The Psychomotor Vigilance Test (PVT), widely used in fatigue studies, has been shown to detect alertness lapses in professional drivers.

Scientific validation for psychomotor tests is ongoing, but early peer-reviewed research is promising. For example, a 2021 study funded by the U.S. Department of Transportation validated the AlertMeter, a mobile-based psychomotor fatigue assessment tool, against the PVT and the Karolinska Sleepiness Scale (KSS). The results showed strong concurrent validity, indicating that AlertMeter effectively detects fatigue-related impairments in workplace settings.

=== Physiological ===
Wearables and in-vehicle systems detect drowsiness or impairment by monitoring eye blinks, head movement, or steering behavior. Some advanced devices use brain-scanning methods like functional near-infrared spectroscopy (fNIRS) to identify cannabis related changes in brain activity. From 2024, the EU mandates drowsiness detection systems in all new vehicles to enhance road safety.

== Applications ==
=== Workplace safety ===
IDTs are used in high-risk industries such as construction, mining, and transportation to assess workers' fitness-for-duty. Daily pre-shift screenings using tablets or wearable devices help prevent accidents by identifying impaired individuals before they begin safety-sensitive tasks.

A 2021 National Safety Council report found that 82% of employers using IDTs saw improved safety outcomes. These tests are also considered less invasive, as they avoid bodily samples and focus on functional performance. States with cannabis legalization are pushing employers to demonstrate actual on-the-job impairment, making IDTs a useful compliance tool.

Workplace safety is definitely a huge concern as impairment doesn't just come from drugs or alcohol. Fatigue, stress, illness, and substance use are what the National Safety Council reports are the most common impairments. All of these can contribute to the person working as it affects them physically and mentally. Because of these, so many incidents involve workers who aren't "chemically" impaired are still technically impaired as any effect on their health can become a liability and cause accidents in the workplace. So, workplaces need to start using impairment detection tool that look for different signs of impairment than just with alcohol or drugs. National Safety Council. "Address Workplace Impairment with Technology." 2021

=== Law enforcement ===
Law enforcement is adopting IDTs to support impaired driving enforcement. Standard tools like breathalyzers detect alcohol, but drugs lack equivalent roadside tests. New devices such as eye-tracking goggles (e.g., Gaize) and cognitive testing tablets offer objective indicators of impairment regardless of substance. These tools supplement field sobriety tests but are still under legal review for admissibility.

The U.S. government is also mandating in-vehicle impairment detection. Under the HALT Act, NHTSA will require new cars to include systems such as driver-monitoring cameras and passive alcohol sensors by 2026 to prevent impaired driving. These technologies are projected to prevent over 10,000 fatalities annually.

=== Other areas ===
IDTs have applications in aviation, rail, healthcare, military, and sports, where cognitive or physical readiness is critical. Airlines may use alertness tests for pilots, hospitals may screen fatigued surgeons, and sports teams may use reaction-time tools to assess concussion-related impairment. These technologies serve as preventive tools wherever safety and peak performance are essential.

== Legality ==
Impairment testing is legally distinct from traditional drug testing, as a result, these tests often fall outside the scope of U.S. drug testing regulations.

In the United States, legislative changes such as California Assembly Bill 2188 limit employment decisions based on non-psychoactive cannabis metabolites, encouraging the adoption of functional impairment assessments. Most impairment detection tools do not collect biometric templates or personally identifiable data to comply with privacy laws like the Biometric Information Privacy Act.

Legal precedent such as The T.J. Hooper case suggests that employers may risk liability for failing to adopt reasonable safety measures like impairment testing in safety-sensitive environments.

In Canada, workplace testing must align with human rights legislation, focusing on job relevance and minimal intrusiveness. The Canadian Supreme Court’s 2013 decision in Irving Pulp & Paper emphasized that random testing requires evidence of significant safety risk. Canadian privacy authorities also recommend limiting personal data collection during testing.

== Regulation ==
In transportation law, the Infrastructure Investment and Jobs Act mandates impairment prevention technology in all new cars by 2026, though it leaves implementation to manufacturers. Similarly, the EU requires driver drowsiness detection in new vehicles, reflecting a trend toward tech-enabled crash prevention.

For law enforcement, impairment tech must meet high standards (like Daubert) to be admissible in court. Devices like eye-tracking tools are under pilot testing, but as of 2025, no non-alcohol IDT has full legal acceptance in DUI cases. Legal validation is ongoing in states like Minnesota.

In workplace, OSHA has not yet issued specific IDT standards, but employers must still ensure safety. Experts recommend using IDTs as screening tools within a broader protocol that includes second-step evaluations.

== Limitations ==
IDTs promise real‑time safety benefits, but their performance varies and many products remain only partially validated. Reviews by the National Safety Council note that, while the scientific principles behind measures such as pupillary response or reaction‑time testing are established, most commercial devices lack peer‑reviewed evidence across populations and impairment sources. Consequently, false positives and false negatives remain a concern; results can be influenced by test environment, individual variability and learning effects.

Two calibration approaches present trade‑offs. Baseline models compare each user to their own sober benchmark, improving sensitivity but requiring initial testing and periodic recalibration; they can also be “gamed” if a user deliberately underperforms when setting the baseline. Fixed cut‑off models are simpler but may misclassify atypical yet unimpaired individuals.

IDTs are cause‑agnostic: a failed alertness or eye‑tracking test reveals functional deficit but not whether it stems from drug use, fatigue, illness or another factor. Follow‑up measures such as medical checks or toxicology are therefore still required for legal or disciplinary action.

User acceptance and operational practicality also limit uptake. Tests must be quick, non‑intrusive and robust to industrial conditions; otherwise they face resistance or logistical hurdles. Regular maintenance and calibration (e.g., for camera‑based systems) add cost and complexity.

Safety experts caution against over‑reliance on a single device. IDTs should complement, not replace, traditional fitness‑for‑duty management and supervisor judgement. Because impairment is multifaceted, no single metric captures every case; hybrid approaches that combine ocular, cognitive and physiological signals are viewed as the most promising long‑term solution.

== See also ==
- Fatigue detection software
- Field sobriety testing
- Driver drowsiness detection
