= Driver drowsiness detection =

Car safety technology

Driver drowsiness detection, also known as driver alertness monitoring, is a car safety technology which helps prevent accidents caused by the driver getting drowsy. Various studies have suggested that around 20% of all road accidents are fatigue-related, up to 50% on certain roads.

Drowsiness can impair a driver’s mental stability, reducing their ability to make sound decisions and potentially leading to physical harm and financial losses for both the driver and passengers.

From 2024, the EU mandates drowsiness detection systems in all new vehicles to enhance road safety.

== Technology ==
Various technologies can be used to try to detect driver drowsiness.

=== Steering pattern monitoring ===
Primarily uses steering input from electric power steering system. Monitoring a driver this way only works as long as the driver actually steers a vehicle actively instead of using an automatic lane-keeping system.

=== Vehicle position in lane monitoring ===
Uses a lane monitoring camera. Monitoring a driver this way only works as long as the driver actually steers a vehicle actively instead of using an automatic lane-keeping system.

=== Driver eye/face monitoring ===
Uses computer vision to observe the driver's face, either using a built-in camera or on mobile devices. Other systems measure eyelid movements with infrared sensors mounted on a spectacle frame rather than a camera. The Optalert system combines several eyelid-movement measures into one score, the Johns Drowsiness Scale (JDS). In a 2023 closed-track study of 12 healthy adults kept awake for 32 to 34 hours, a five-minute JDS test taken after a two-hour drive detected severe end-of-drive impairment with an area under the curve of 0.99, compared with 0.93 for the Karolinska Sleepiness Scale and 0.92 for psychomotor vigilance task reaction time.

=== Physiological measurement ===
Requires body sensors to measure parameters like brain activity, heart rate, skin conductance, heartbeat, muscle activity, head movements, among others.

A 2021 review of commercial driver sleepiness detection products found that most continuous monitoring technologies lacked scientific validation, and called for field studies of the sensitivity and specificity of their alerts.

== Systems ==
- Audi: Rest recommendation system
- BMW: Active Driving Assistant with Attention Assistant analyses driving behaviour and, if necessary, advises the driver to rest. The advice to take a break is provided in the form of graphic symbols shown on the Control Display.
- Bosch: "Driver drowsiness detection" takes input from the steering angle sensor, front-mounted lane assist camera, vehicle speed and turn signal stalk.
- Citroën: AFIL/LDWS uses different technologies to monitor the vehicle position on the road. Some models use sensors mounted in front of the front wheels, monitoring the lane markings. Other models use a camera mounted in top center of the windscreen for the same purpose. Both systems alert the driver by vibrations in the driver's seat, on the left or right half of the seat cushion, respectively. Introduced with the 2005 model C4, later followed by 2008 C5 and 2013 C4 Picasso.
- DS:
  - AFIL/LDWS: Lane Departure Warning System gives an audible reminder if you drift out of your lane.
  - DS DRIVER ATTENTION MONITORING identifies any reduction in driver alertness. Using an infrared camera above the steering wheel, DS DRIVER ATTENTION MONITORING continuously monitors: the eyes for signs of tiredness (blinking); the face and head movements for signs of distraction; and the course steered by the car in its road lane (deviations or steering movements by the driver).
- Ford: Driver Alert, introduced with 2011 Ford Focus.
- Honda: CRV introduced the Driver Attention Monitor in 2017. It is also offered on the 2018 Accord
- Hyundai: Driver Attention Alert (DAA), debuted with the 2017 i30.
- Jaguar Land Rover: Driver Condition Monitor and Driver Fatigue Alert, both evaluate driving technique for signs of driver fatigue. When the feature determines if the driver is fatigued, the message center displays the warning, TAKE A BREAK!, for 1 minute, accompanied by an audible chime. When driving continues for more than 15 minutes after the first warning, without taking a break, a further warning is given. The warning continues until the OK button on the steering wheel menu control is pressed.
- Kia: Driver Attention Warning (DAW), debuted with the 2018 Stinger.
- Mazda: Driver Attention Alert Activates at speeds above 65 kilometres per hour (40 mph). Learns driving behavior through steering input and position of road during the beginning of the ride and compares the learned data during later stages of the ride. A difference above a certain threshold triggers an audible and visual cue. Debuted on 2015 Mazda CX-5.
- Mercedes-Benz: Attention Assist In 2009, Mercedes-Benz unveiled a system called Attention Assist which monitors the driver's fatigue level and drowsiness based on his/her driving inputs. It issues a visual and audible alarm to alert the driver if they are too drowsy to continue driving. It is linked to the car's navigation system, and using that data, it can tell the driver where coffee and fuel are available.
- Cadillac: GM 2018 Cadillac CT6 Super Cruise System, The Cadillac Super Cruise system uses FOVIO vision technology, developed by Seeing Machines, to enable a gumdrop-sized infrared camera on the steering wheel column to accurately determine the driver's attention state. This is accomplished through a precise measure of head orientation and eyelid movements under a full range of daytime and night-time driving conditions including the use of sunglasses.
- Nissan: Driver Attention Alert (DAA), debuted with the 2014 Qashqai, followed by 2016 Maxima.
- Renault/Dacia: Tiredness Detection Warning (TDW), introduced with 2016 Megane.
- Subaru: EyeSight Driver Assist
- Škoda: iBuzz Fatigue Alert (available on most models since 2013 onwards)
- Volkswagen: Fatigue detection system
- Volvo Cars: Driver Alert Control In 2007, Volvo Cars launched the world's first Driver Drowsiness Detection system, Driver Alert Control. The system monitors the car's movements and assesses whether the vehicle is being driven in a controlled or uncontrolled way. If the system detects a high risk of the driver being drowsy, the driver is alerted via an audible signal. Also, a text message appears in the car's information display, alerting him or her with a coffee cup symbol to take a break. Additionally, the driver can continuously retrieve driving information from the car's trip computer. The starting-point is five bars. The less consistent the driving, the fewer bars remain.
- Anti Sleep Pilot - Danish device that can be fitted to any vehicle, uses a combination of accelerometers and reaction tests.
- Vigo - Smart Bluetooth headset that detects signs of drowsiness through the eyes and head motion, and uses a combination of light, sound, and vibration to alert the user.
- COREforTech - Measuring physiological signs of drowsiness allows CORE for Tech ™ to get very early signs of fatigue and act accordingly
- Impairment detection technology: assessing an individual’s functional state in real time by monitoring cognitive performance or physiological responses.

== Regulation ==
In European Union, regulation (EU) 2019/2144 "General Safety Regulation" introduced high level requirements for vehicle safety systems, including the driver monitoring system.

driver drowsiness and attention warning means a system that assesses the driver’s alertness through vehicle systems analysis and warns the driver if needed

— regulation (EU) 2019/2144

Driver drowsiness and attention warning and advanced driver distraction warning systems shall be designed in such a way that those systems do not continuously record nor retain any data other than what is necessary in relation to the purposes for which they were collected or otherwise processed within the closed-loop system. Furthermore, those data shall not be accessible or made available to third parties at any time and shall be immediately deleted after processing. Those systems shall also be designed to avoid overlap and shall not prompt the driver separately and concurrently or in a confusing manner where one action triggers both systems.

— regulation (EU) 2019/2144

These high level requirements are, since 2021, fully defined in an implementing act at EU level. Outside EU, the UNECE working group "Driver Drowsiness and Distraction Warning Systems" intends to "develop draft regulatory proposals for two new UN Regulations on Driver Drowsiness and Driver Distraction to prevent crashes caused by the driver not paying attention to the driving task." (first entry of the terms of reference of the working group)

== See also ==
- Driver Monitoring System (Toyota)
- Fatigue detection software
