= Optalert =

Australian business

Optalert is an Australian company that develops technology for monitoring drowsiness. The company was founded by sleep expert Dr Murray Johns who developed the Epworth Sleepiness Scale. The company invented a personal safety device for transport workers to detect and prevent drowsy driving.

== Fatigue monitoring systems ==
Optalert's fatigue monitoring system uses infra-red light to measures a driver’s levels of alertness continuously and objectively in real time. It is the first validated system that provides early warning signs of drowsiness. It includes a pair of glasses connected to a small computer processor in the vehicle. The glasses emit and detect low levels of infrared light to sense movements in the eyes and eyelids. These movements are fed into a computer that measures a driver's drowsiness and sounds an alarm when the movements show the driver is becoming drowsy.

The system combines several eyelid-movement measures, including blink duration, the amplitude-velocity ratio of eyelid closure and the time the eyes remain closed, into a single score called the Johns Drowsiness Scale (JDS).

== Scientific validation ==
A 2013 laboratory study by researchers at Brigham and Women's Hospital, including Charles Czeisler of Harvard Medical School, monitored 29 healthy adults using the Optalert system during 30 hours of continuous wakefulness. The Johns Drowsiness Scale (JDS) was the most sensitive of the ocular measures tested for detecting drowsiness associated with time awake and time of day. It was also the strongest predictor of subsequent lapses on the psychomotor vigilance task (area under the curve 0.74) and Karolinska Sleepiness Scale ratings (0.80).

A 2021 rapid review by Cori et al. examined commercial driver sleepiness-detection technologies, comparing their specifications, costs, intended users and scientific validation. The review found that most commercial continuous-monitoring technologies lacked device-specific scientific validation and identified the need for further field studies and longitudinal research to assess their performance under real-world driving conditions.

== Use ==
Optalert supplies transport and mining companies in Asia, Africa, South America and Australia including BHP, Toll, BIS Industries, Oz Minerals, WestNet Energy and Sutherland’s Transport.

== Optalert Reports ==
The company has launched a service called Optalert Reports. It takes information from an onboard computer connected to a driver’s glasses to create an activity summary and travel log over a period of days or months. It can be used to identify potential risks and plan work schedules based on avoiding risk.

== Awards ==
Optalert won an Australian Design Mark in the 2007 Australian Design Award. It was a finalist in the 4th Annual Australian Mining Prospect Awards.

Optalert also received a Bronze in the Industrial Designers Society of America (IDSA's) International Design Excellence Awards 2007.
