= Mercedes-Benz B-Class (W246) =

German hatchback (2011–2018)

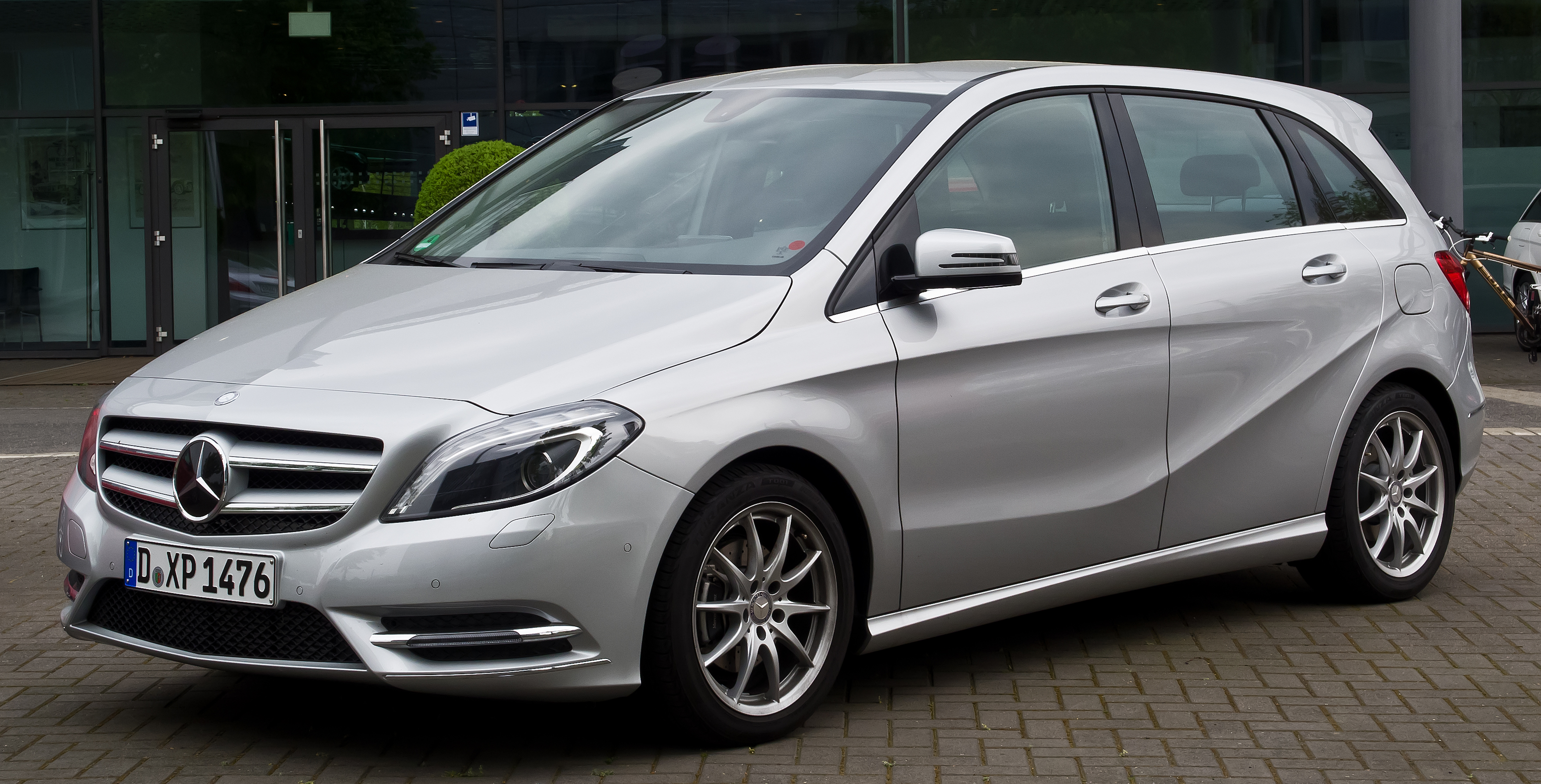
- 2014 Mercedes-Benz B 200 CDI pre-facelift 5-door hatchback (Germany)

Overview
- Manufacturer: Daimler AG
- Production: November 2011 – December 2018
- Model years: 2012–2018
- Assembly: Germany: Rastatt; Hungary: Kecskemét

Body and chassis
- Class: Subcompact executive car (C)
- Body style: 5-door hatchback
- Layout: Front-engine, front-wheel-drive / four-wheel-drive (4matic)
- Platform: Mercedes-Benz MFA
- Related: A-Class (W176); GLA-Class (X156); CLA-Class (C117)

Powertrain
- Engine: 1.6L M270DE16LAR/M270DE16LA BlueEFFIENCY petrol I4 (turbo); 2.0L M270DE20LA BlueEFFIENCY petrol I4 (turbo); 1.5L OM607 CDi diesel I4; 1.8L OM651 CDi diesel I4; 2.1L OM651 CDi diesel I4
- Electric motor: Synchronous Electric Motor
- Transmission: 6-speed manual 7-speed dual-clutch (7G-DCT); 1-speed automatic with fixed ratio

Dimensions
- Wheelbase: 2,699 mm (106.3 in)
- Length: 4,359–4,392 mm (171.6–172.9 in)
- Width: 1,786 mm (70.3 in)
- Height: 1,557 mm (61.3 in)
- Curb weight: 1,435–1,650 kg (3,164–3,638 lb)

Chronology
- Predecessor: Mercedes-Benz W245
- Successor: Mercedes-Benz W247

W246 is the internal designation for the second generation Mercedes-Benz B-Class, a range of 5-door hatchbacks produced by German luxury manufacturer Daimler AG under the Mercedes-Benz brand from late 2011 to late 2018. Introduced at the 2011 International Motor Show Germany as a subcompact executive car, model years for the W246 started at 2012 and ranged to 2018. European models went on sale in November 2011. Japanese and Australian models went on sale in April 2012, and Canadian models in late 2012 as the 2013 model year. They were assembled at Rastatt, Germany, and from 2011 at Kecskemét, Hungary. By summer 2013, over 230,000 second generation B-Class cars had been delivered.

Seen as a taller and a more practical alternative to the Mercedes-Benz A-Class, the W246 was available in petrol, diesel, natural gas, and a battery electric variant. Classified as a small MPV by Euro NCAP, the B-Class features hatchback-directed styling. The Electric Drive model is internally designated as W242, and had started production in the US from 11 August 2014, and was available in Germany from November 2014 to October 2017. The Electric Drive was also Mercedes’ first battery electric vehicle mass-produced vehicle.

In November 2014, the brand had presented the facelifted B-Class W246, which had featured a light headlamp and tail lamp update. The facelift was revealed for the 2015 model year. Production ended in December 2018, and the W246 was replaced by the W247 B-Class.

In August 2014, BMW had launched the 2 Series Active Tourer, a direct competitor to the B-Class.

== Development and launch ==
In early 2011, it was disclosed to the public that the B-Class would be launched sometime throughout the year. Jörg Prigl, Mercedes’ boss of development at the time, stated that the new A and B-Class would use the MFA platform. Prigl had stated, “We will start with the B-Class and the MFA platform will contain an intellectual property solution that will allow us to produce both a direct, high-roof, high seating position replacement for the B-class.” Prigl had also mentioned that the MFA architecture was so versatile that it allowed the integration of a full cell stack, a battery pack, hydrogen tanks and compressed natural gas. Before launch, the B-Class was also thought to be available in a sedan body style. British magazine Auto Express expected it to be called the "BLS". Although this nameplate never came to fruition, the 4.6 metre long Mercedes-Benz CLA subcompact executive sedan launched slightly after the B-Class.

The W246 was revealed in August 2011, and made its public debut in September 2011 at the 2011 International Motor Show Germany. It was announced that the B-Class would come standard with a 6-speed manual transmission, as well as an optional 7G-Tronic automatic. The start/stop technology was standard on all models. A 4,360 mm (172 in) hatchback, it belongs to the C-segment in the small family car classification.

Mass production of the B-Class started in November 2011 at the Rastatt plant in Germany. Additionally, the B-Class was the first vehicle to use the MFA platform.

== Design ==
=== Exterior ===
The exterior design incorporates the design of a tall-roof hatchback and a compact minivan. Compared to its predecessor, the W246 is 90 mm (3.5 in) longer, 8 mm (0.31 in) wider, and is 46 mm (1.8 in) lower, while its wheel base has shortened by 80 mm (3.1 in). The W246 is also one of the first to use Mercedes’ new design cue, which was introduced in later models such as the W222 S-Class, X156 GLA, and the W205 C-Class. The B-Class retains its basic body style, however gains a more upright pose, and is significantly less curvier, especially at the rear. The basic head and tail lamps are still on the B-Class, however, the B-Class W246 is available with LEDs, and the daytime running lights and indicators gain a switchback effect. The W246 has a drag coefficient figure of 0.26 Cd, down from the 0.31 figure of the previous model. The W246 features a larger grille, as well its centre of gravity being lowered by 20 mm. The W246's lights were also inspired by those of the C218 CLS.

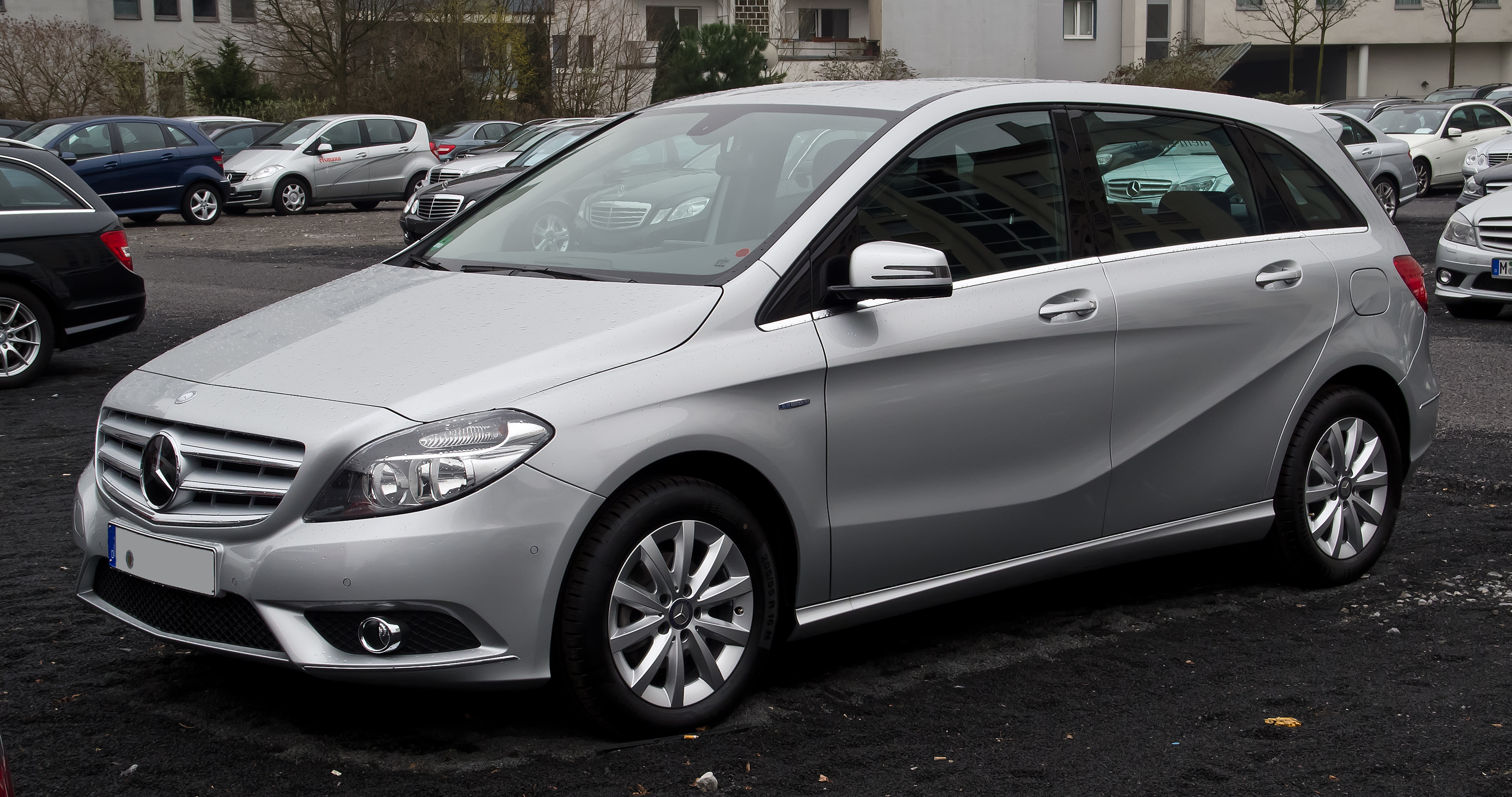
2012 Mercedes-Benz B 180 BlueEFFICIENCY (pre-facelift; front)

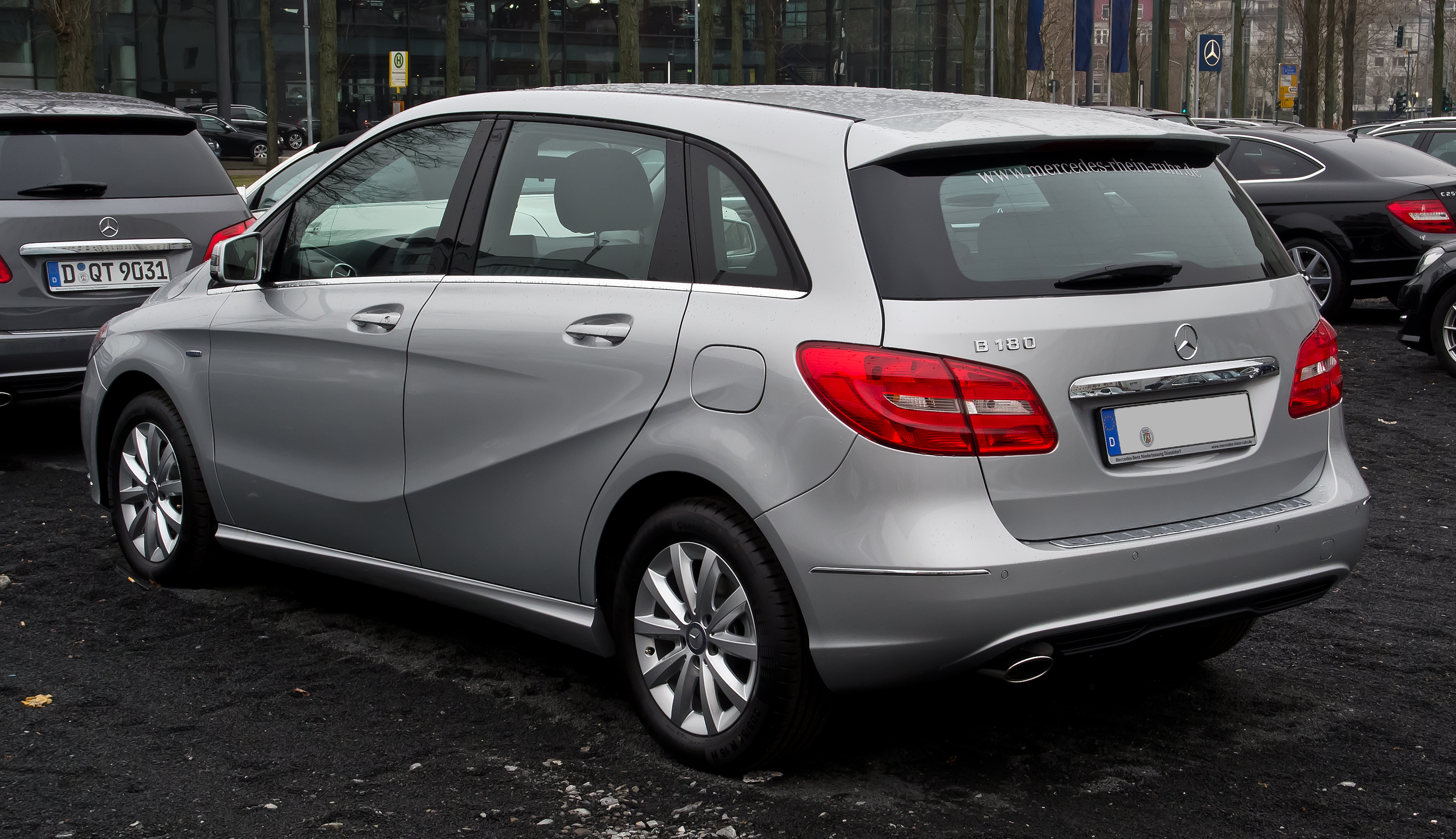
2012 Mercedes-Benz B 180 BlueEFFICIENCY (pre-facelift; rear)

=== Features ===
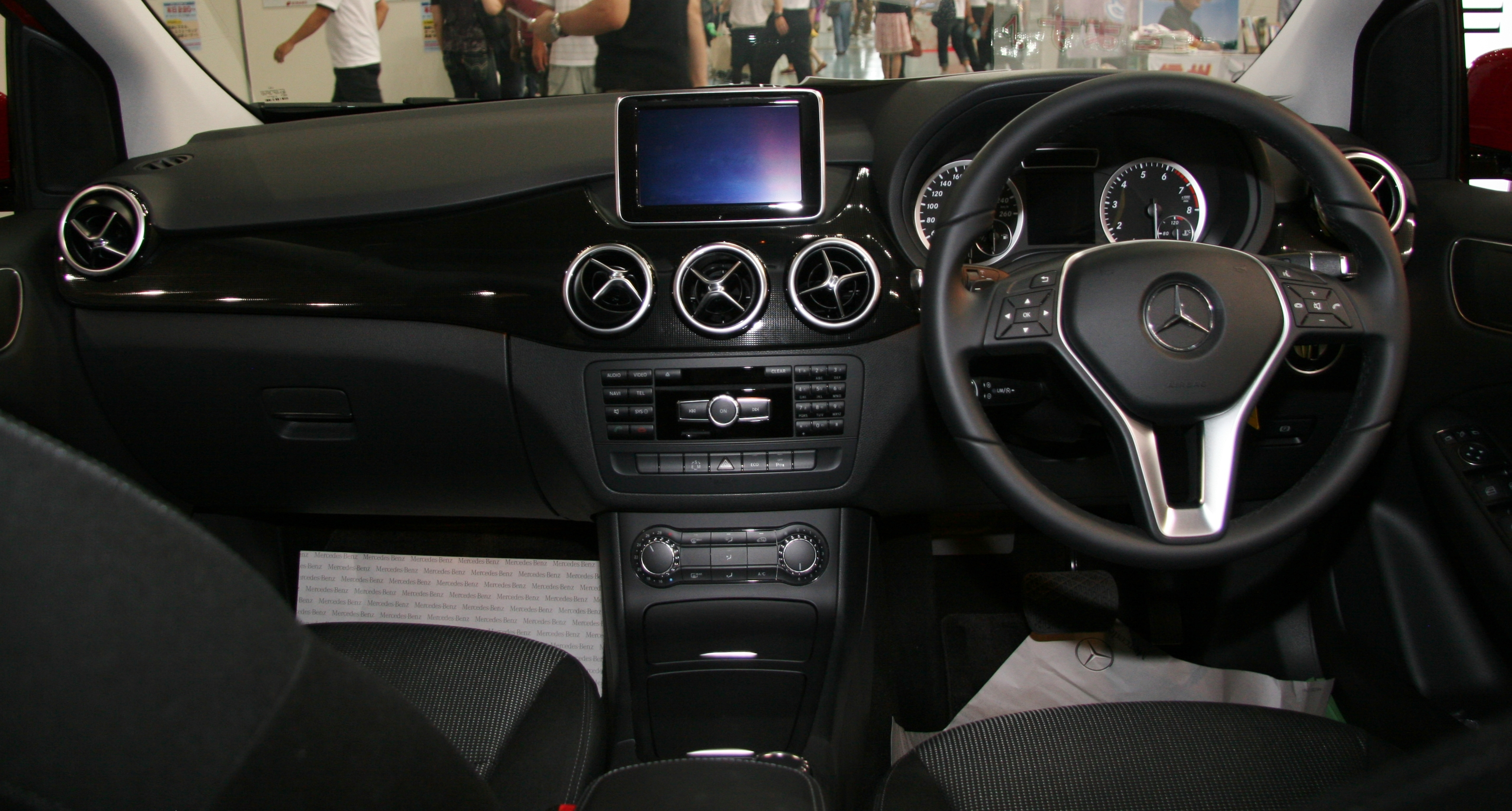
Interior

Safety features include seven to nine airbags, hill-start assist, driver drowsiness detection, tyre pressure monitoring, Pre-Safe system that will tighten seatbelts, and a system that will automatically close the windows and the sunroof if the systems detect an approaching accident. Other safety systems include anti-lock braking (ABS), electronic stability control (ESC), and brake assistant (BA).

Like the W176 A-Class which the B-Class shares its platform with, the W246 has MacPherson strut front suspension, while featuring a four-link setup at the rear. The BlueEFFICIENCY is featured on the Mk2 B-Class, which is a series of measures which reduce fuel consumption and CO_{2} emissions. These features include: start/stop function which switches off the engine temporarily when the vehicle is stationary, alternator management for regenerative braking, and optimised tyres for rolling resistance which have low energy requirements while driving and also help to reduce fuel consumption. The B 180 CDI BlueEFFICIENCY model was available from September 2011.

== Trim levels ==
=== Europe ===
In Europe, three trim levels were available on the pre-facelift. The entry-level SE offered 16-inch alloy wheels, LED daytime running lamps, comfort suspension, cruise control, CD multimedia system, a reversing camera, 7-inch infotainment screen, USB ports with smartphone integration, air conditioning, adjustable boot floor, and man-made leather upholstery. The Sport trim adds 17-inch alloy wheels, twin sport exhaust pipes, interior lighting package, automatic windscreen wipers, and a larger infotainment with the addition of two-way climate control. The AMG Line model features AMG-style front, side and rear aprons, 18-inch AMG-type alloy wheels with five double spokes, radiator grille, a dual exhaust system with trapezoidal stainless steel tailpipe trims, lowered suspension, perforated brake discs, artificial leather with contrasting red stitching, a multi-function steering wheel which is covered in leather and has red contrasting topstitching, a revised instrument cluster, and a sports pedal system and red contrasting topstitching and silver chrome. In July 2012, for the 2013 model year, Mercedes had added illuminated door sills and an auxiliary heater which had included a remote control as optional.

Available packages consisted of Executive, Premium and Premium Plus. The Executive pack features parking assist, heated seats and automatically dimming and folding mirrors. The Premium pack features LED headlights and satellite navigation. Adding to the Executive and Premium packages, the Premium Plus features a larger tablet display, a panoramic glass sunroof and dual-zone climate control. In Germany, available packages are the "Chrom-Paket" (Chrome Package), "Night-Paket" (Night Package), "Sport-Paket" (Sport Package), "Exklusiv-Paket" (Exclusive Package), "Licht- und Sicht-Paket" (Light and Sight Package), and the "Sondermodell Edition 1" (Special Edition 1).

A natural gas variant of the B 200 was available. It includes a choice of manual or 7G-DCT dual clutch transmission, and was available from early 2013. European model was set to go on sale in February 2014.

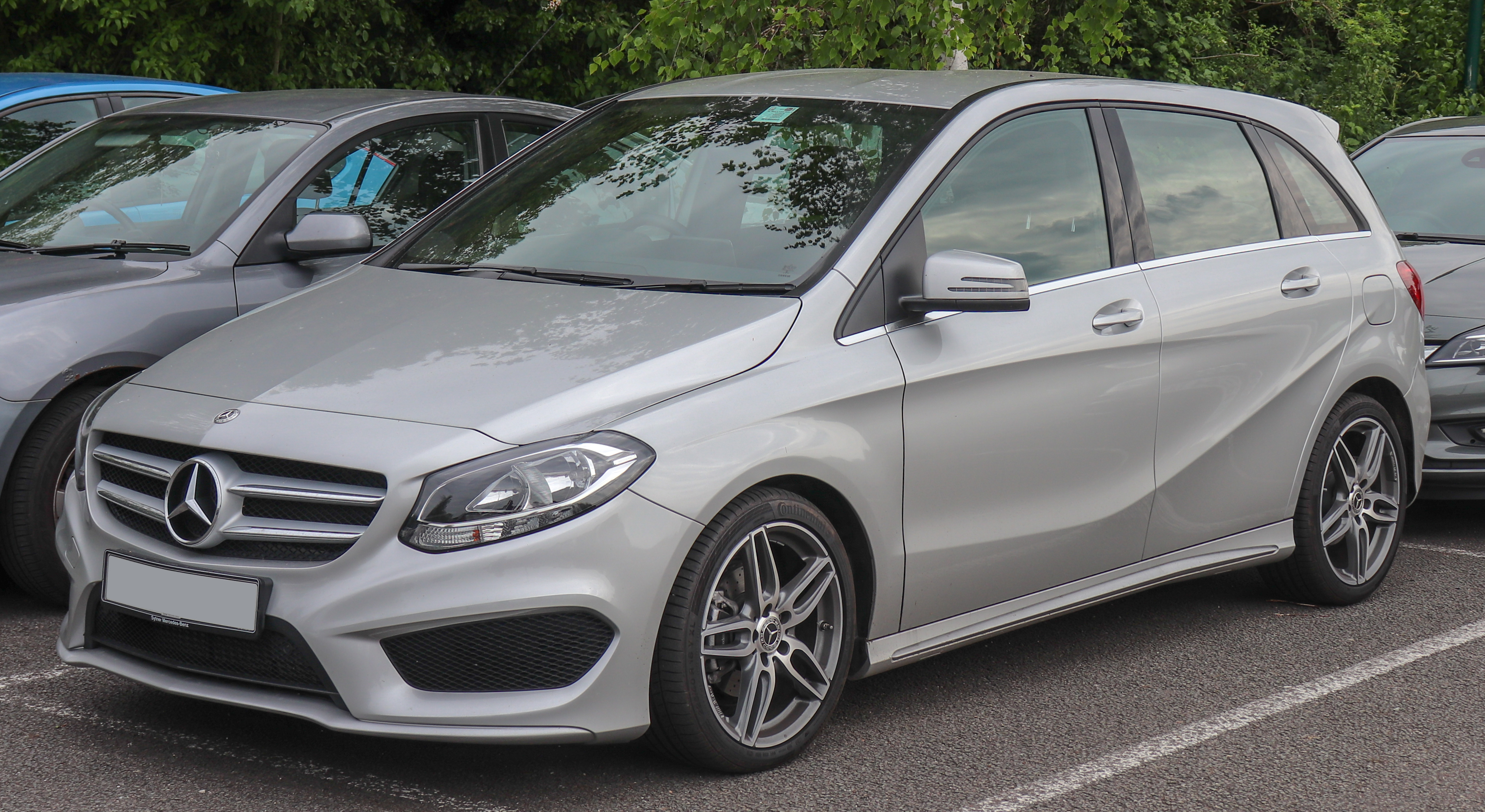
2018 Mercedes-Benz B 180 AMG Line (facelift; UK)

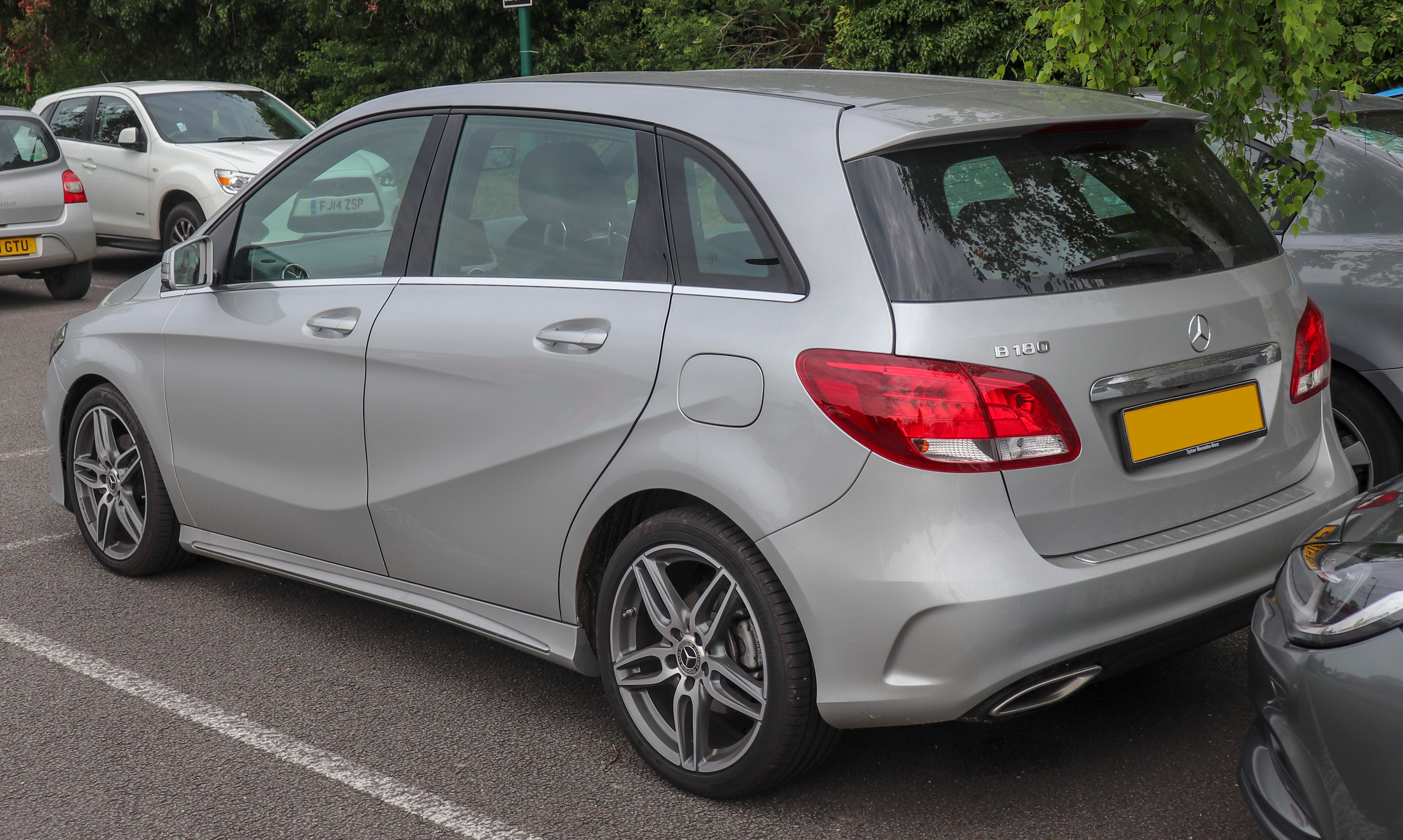
2018 Mercedes-Benz B 180 AMG Line (facelift; UK)

=== Canada ===
In Canada, for the pre-facelift model, there was only one trim level (B250 Sports Tourer) offered in FWD. But in 2015, a second trim level was added for the facelift (B250 Sports Tourer and B250 4Matic AWD). Both trim levels feature standard heated seats, an auto start/stop, a seven-speed dual clutch transmission, and a 2.0-litre turbo-cylinder making up to 208 hp (155 kW) and 258 lb⋅ft (350 N⋅m) of torque. The trim differences between the two are subtle but lie in the B250 Sports Tourer FWD acceleration of 0–100 km/h (62 mph) in 6.8 seconds, while the 4Matic AWD has better traction control thanks to its all-wheel-drive suspension and a slightly quicker acceleration time of 0–100 km/h in 6.7 seconds.

The B250 offers a wide selection of packages to choose from:

The Versatility package adds a powered front driver's seat with powered lumbar support, with the addition of auto-dimming rearview and side mirrors, power-folding mirror controls, a universal garage door opener, and a storage system dubbed Easy Vario Plus that adds a flat-folding front passenger seat, fore and aft sliding rear seats, a height-adjustable cargo floor, and enhanced iPhone connectivity via Apple CarPlay. The Premium Package adds a black fabric roof-liner and panoramic sunroof, dual-zone auto HVAC, a rearview camera, navigation, DVD player and blindspot assist. And lastly, the Sport package adds an AMG-style appearance, an AMG sporty front bumper, 18-inch AMG alloy wheels, sport brakes, lowered suspension, direct steering, AMG floor mats, black leather seats, and carbon-look trim, while additional options include partial LED headlamps, keyless proximity access, satellite radio, and parking assist.

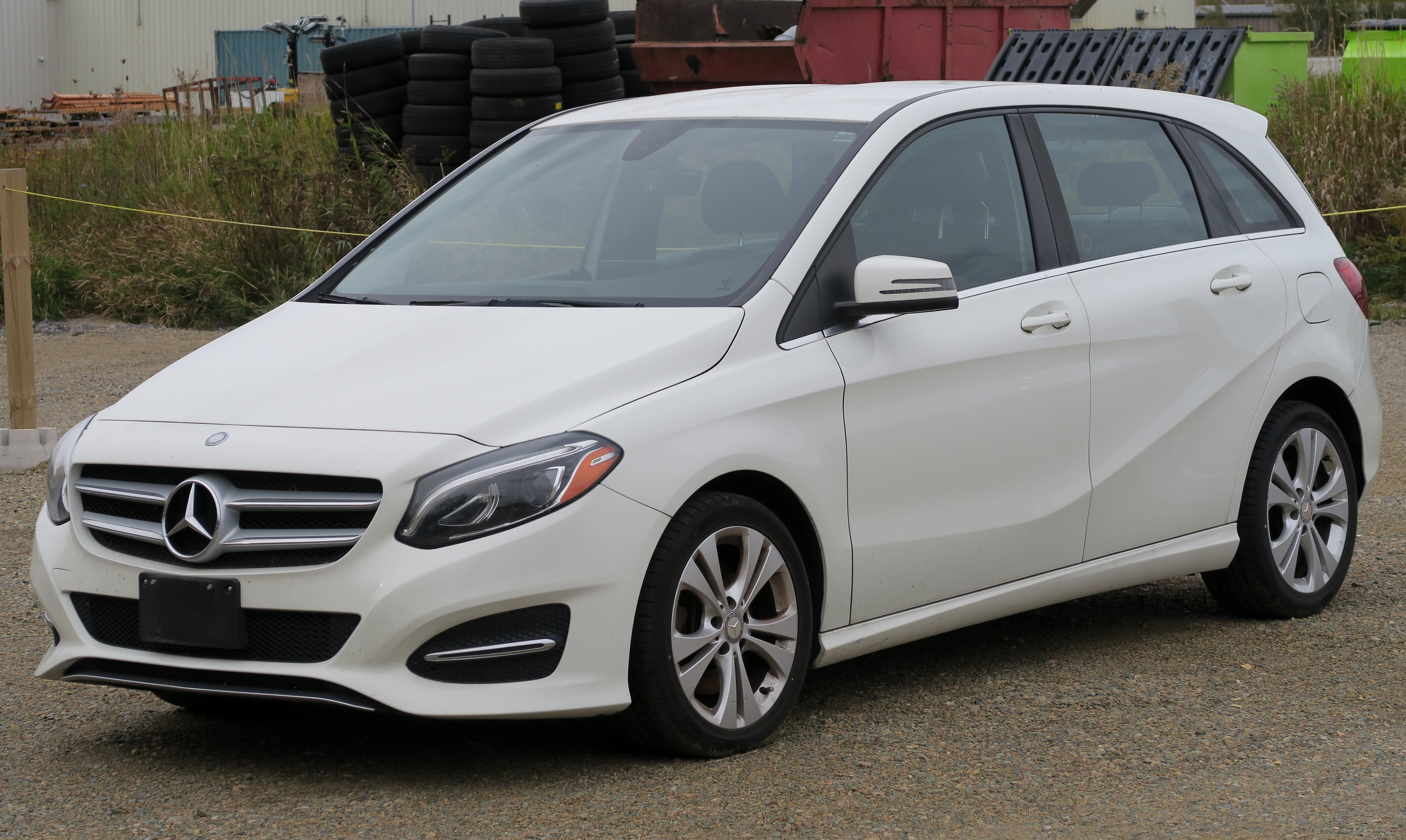
2016 Mercedes-Benz B250 4Matic (facelift; Canada)

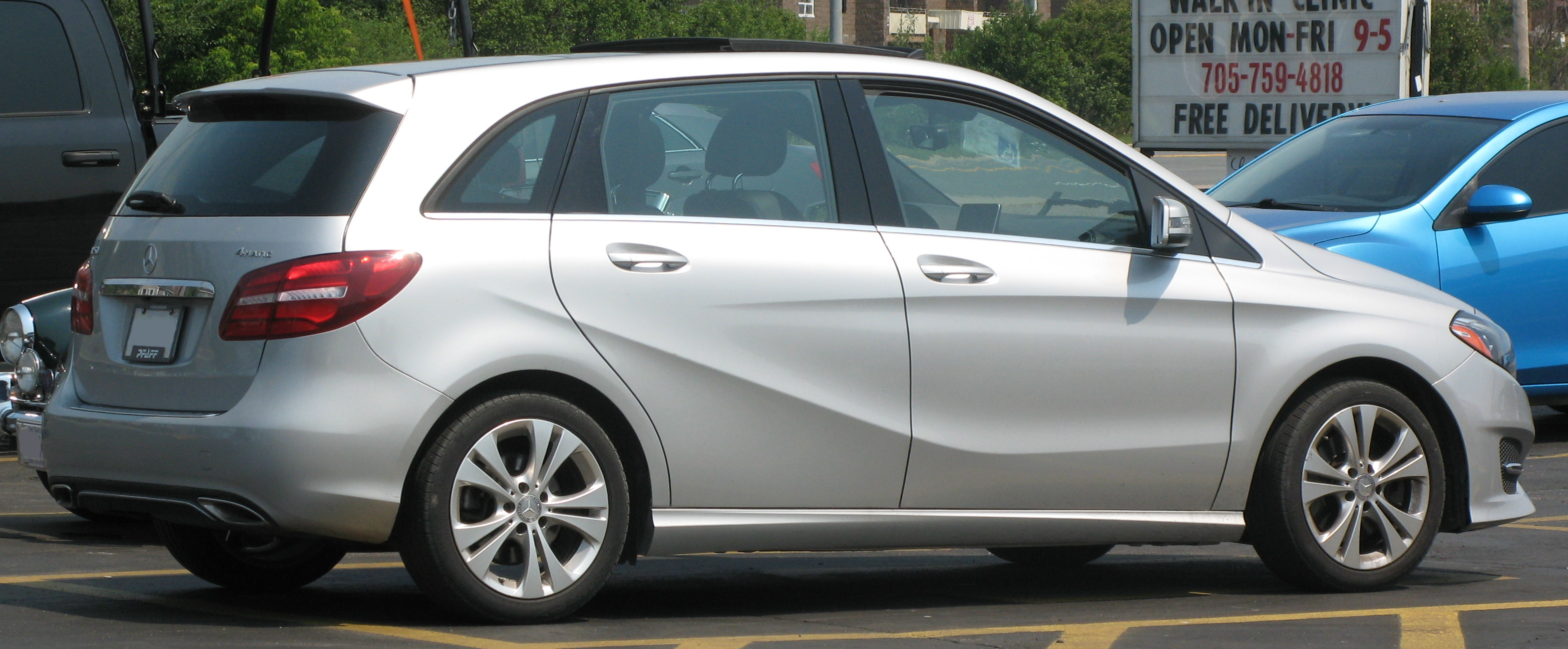
2016 Mercedes-Benz B250 4Matic (facelift; Canada)

=== Australia ===
In Australia, trims are sold as models (B180, B200, B250). Models started at the B180 which featured 16-inch, 10-spoke alloy wheels, six-speaker audio system, Bluetooth audio streaming, 14.7 cm TFT colour display, climate control air conditioning, cruise control, front and rear parking sensors, trip computer, 1/3 to 2/3 rear folding seats, and rains sensing wipers. The B200 added 17-inch alloy wheels, Artico leather seats, four-way power adjustable front seats, leather steering wheel, electrochromatic door and rear view mirrors, black ash wood trim and additional chrome highlights. The B200 is able to be distinguished by its three-louvre silver grille and chrome highlights. Finally, the B250 for Australia features 18-inch alloy wheels, lowered "Avantgarde" suspension, bi-xenon headlights with washers, and privacy glass.

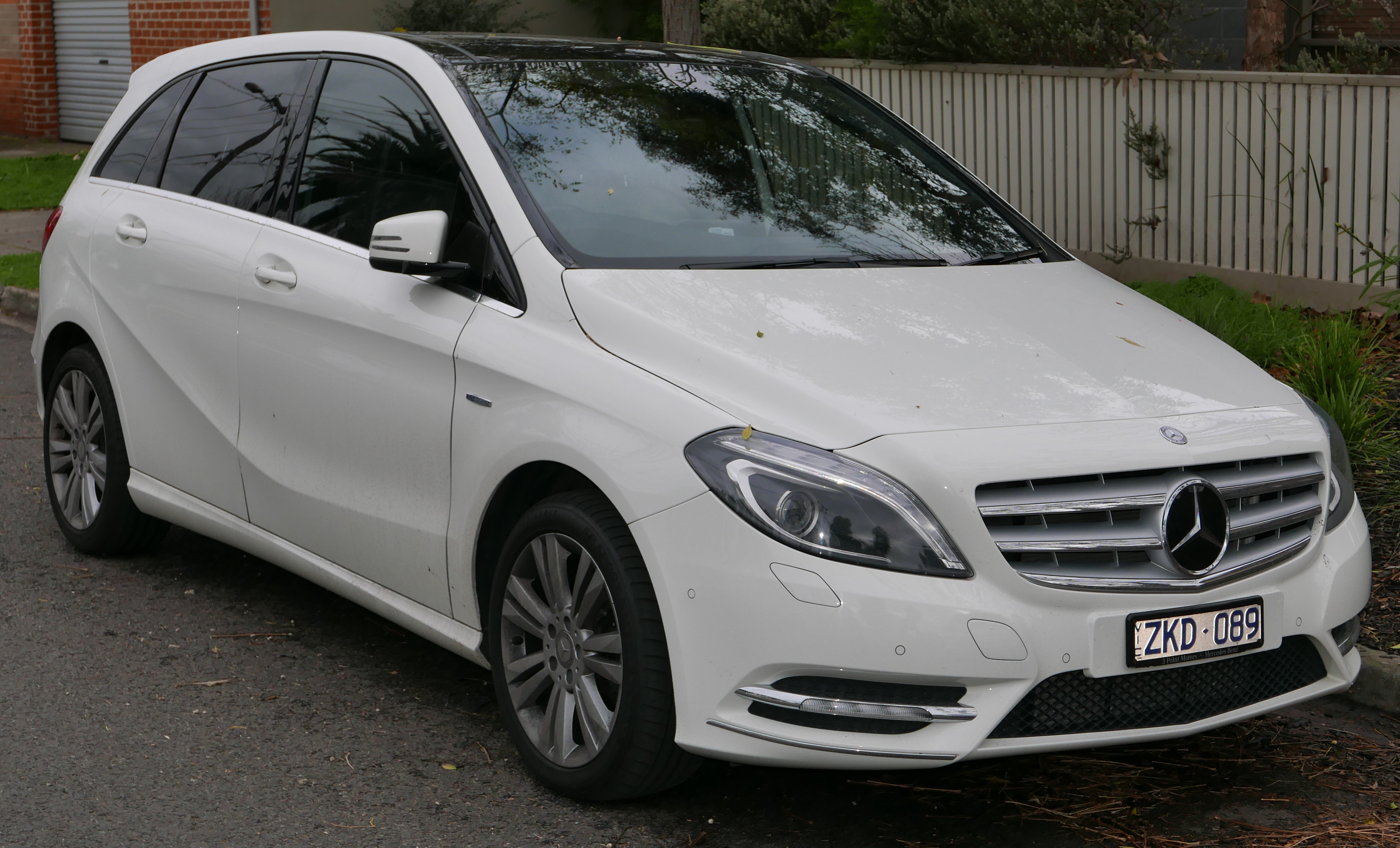
2012 Mercedes-Benz B 200 CDI BlueEFFICIENCY (pre-facelift; Australia)

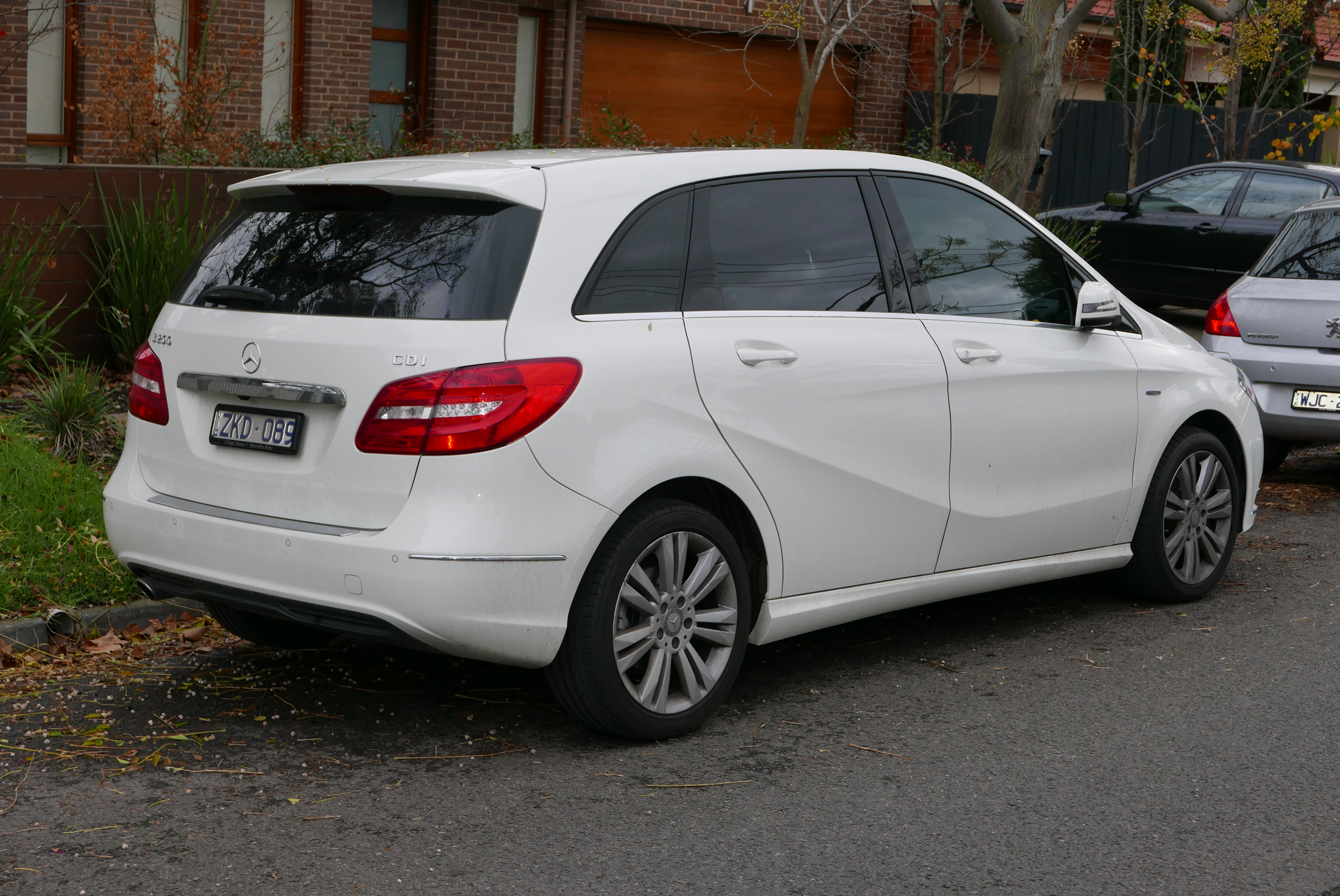
2012 Mercedes-Benz B 200 CDI BlueEFFICIENCY (pre-facelift; Australia)

== B-Class Electric Drive (W242) ==
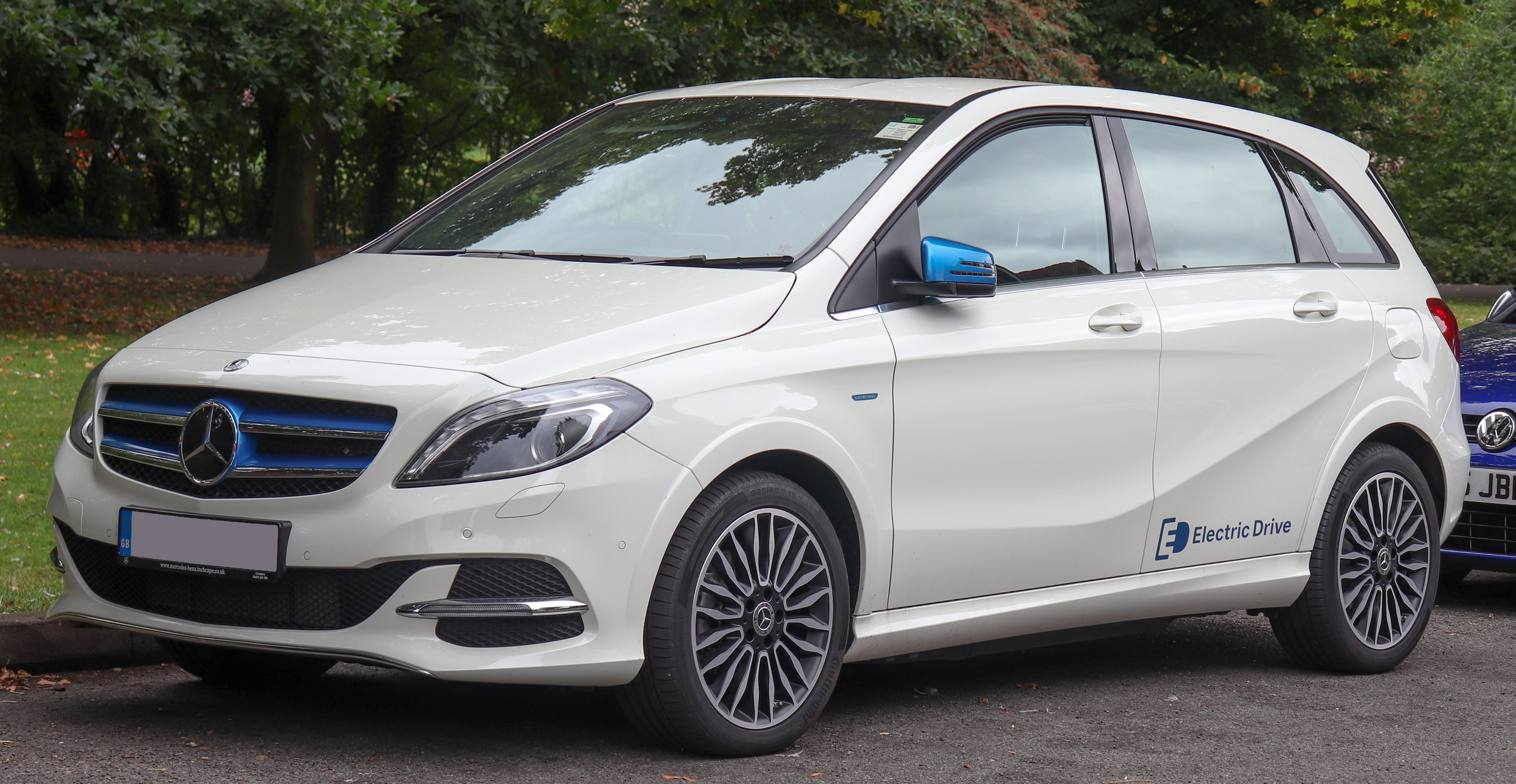

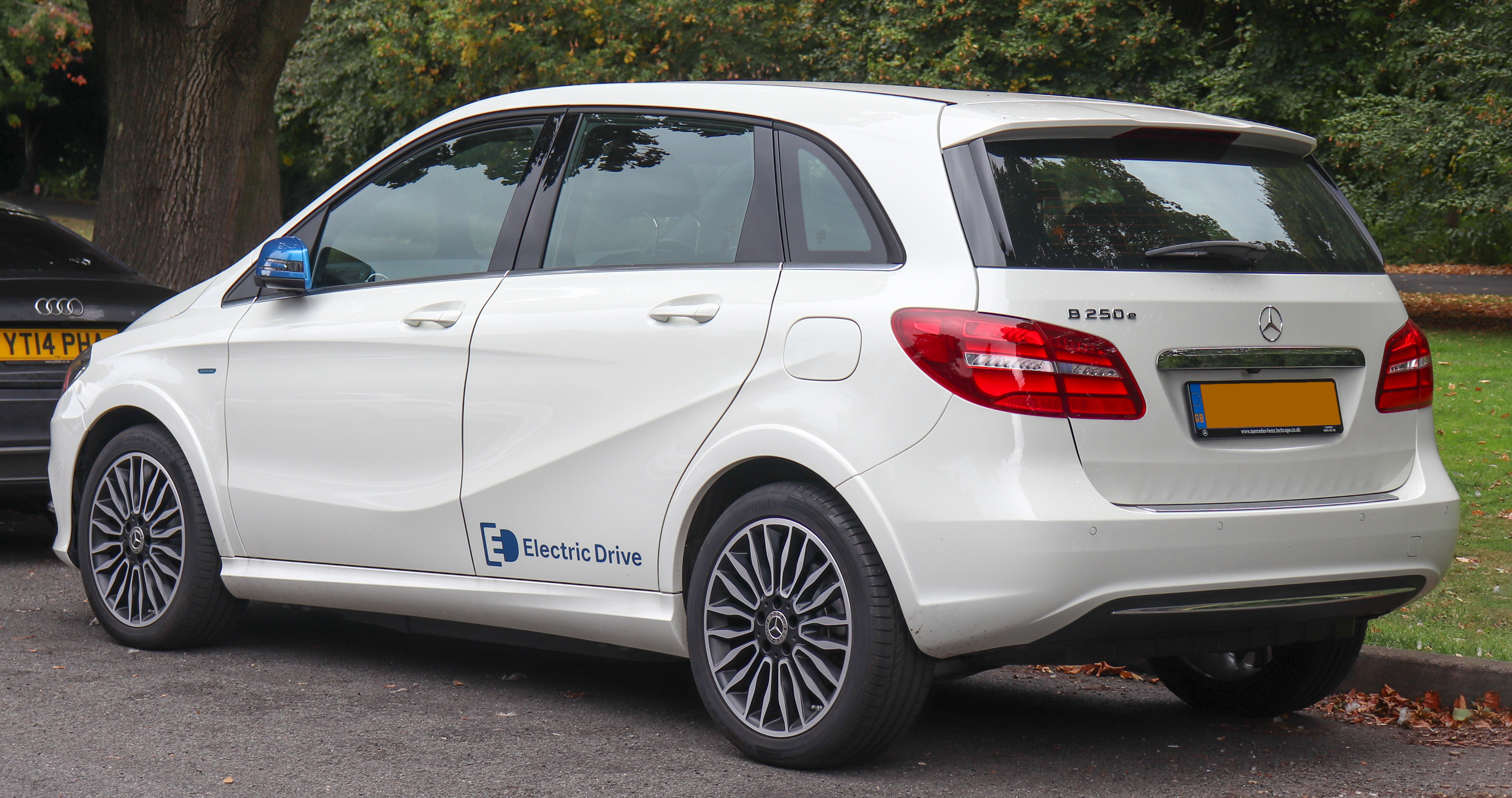
Production Mercedes-Benz B-Class Electric Drive

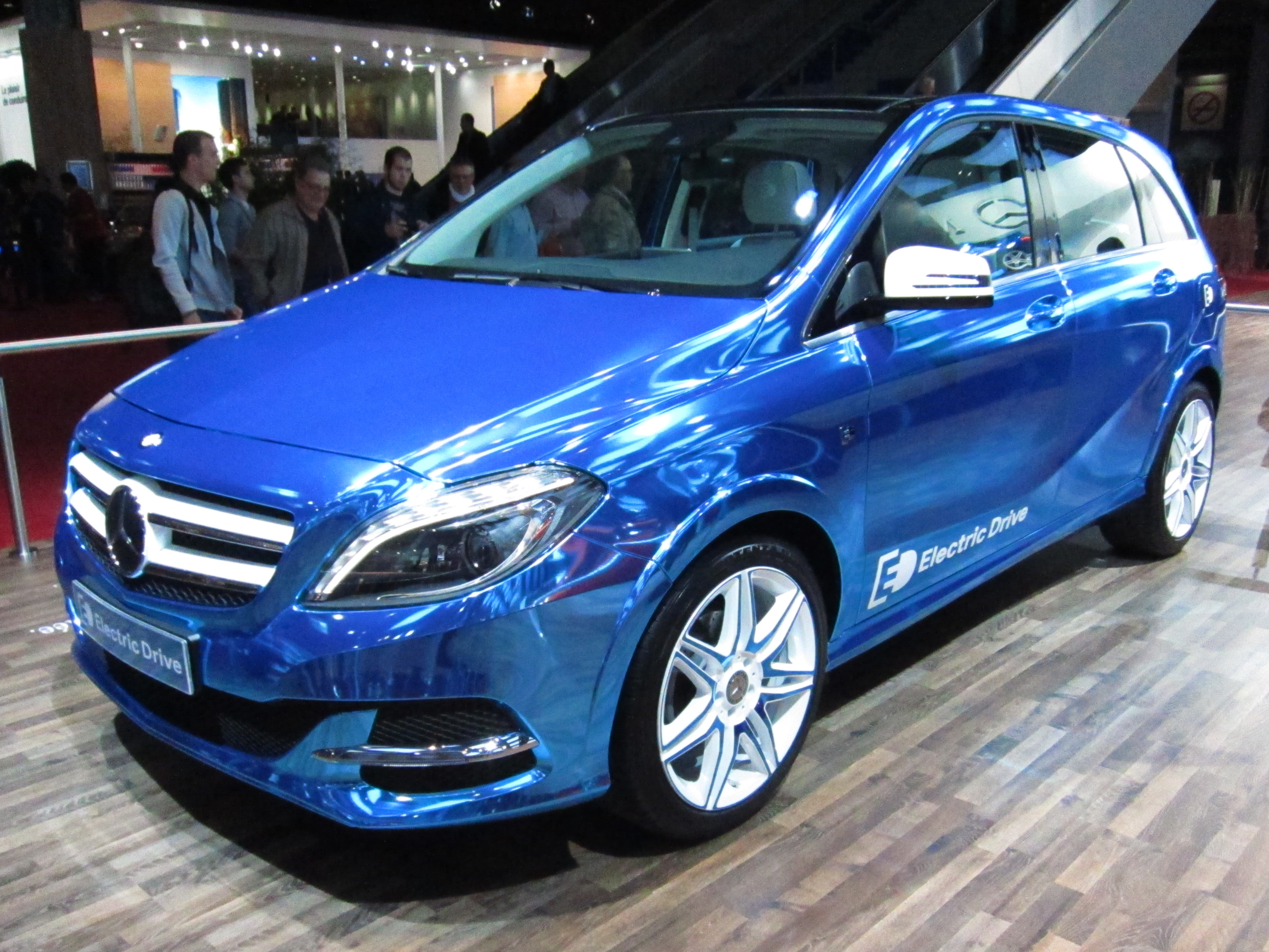
The Mercedes-Benz Concept B-Class Electric Drive was unveiled at the 2012 Paris Motor Show.

Initial concept versions of the B-Class Electric Drive were developed under the Mercedes-Benz BlueZERO project using batteries from Li-tec and a drivetrain from Tesla. The Electric Drive was previewed at the 2012 Paris Motor Show, the 2013 New York International Auto Show, and the 2013 IAA International Motor Show 2013. Production for retail customers began in April 2014 at Mercedes-Benz Rastatt factory. In May 2014, Mercedes announced the B-Class Electric Drive will be available in Germany and the UK in the first quarter of 2015. In November, Mercedes-Benz announced pricing for Germany and started accepting orders.

The concept has an electric motor rated at 136 PS (100 kW; 134 hp) and 310 N⋅m (229 lb⋅ft), powered by a 36 kWh lithium-ion battery from Tesla Motors. The vehicle has a driving range of 200 km (124 mi) with a top speed of 150 km/h (93 mph). The battery can be charged at any standard domestic 230 V single phase AC power outlet or 400 V three phase rapid charging terminal. Tesla Supercharging was not enabled, but the car can be converted with JdeMO aftermarket parts to use CHAdeMO.

=== United States ===
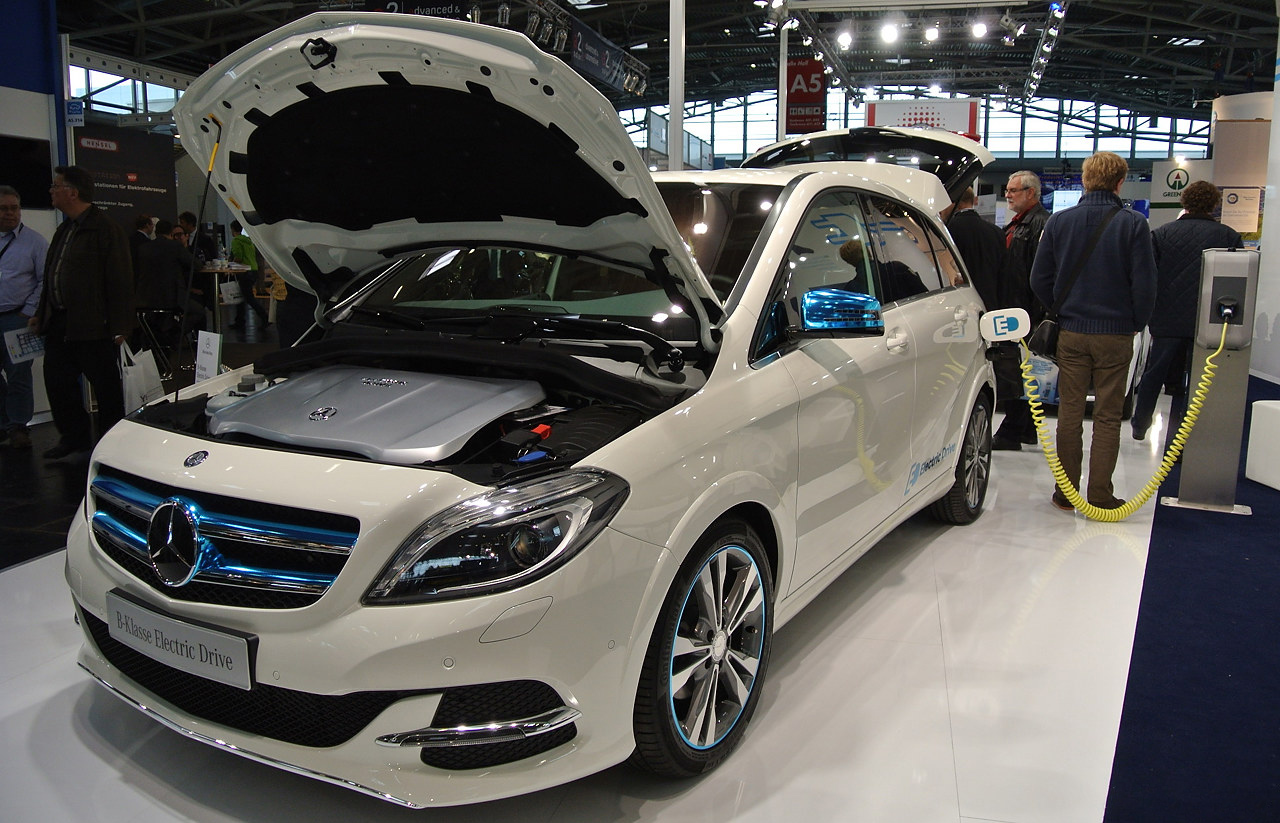
Production Mercedes-Benz B-Class Electric Drive charging

The B-Class Electric Drive was introduced to the U.S. in December 2013 as an early 2014 model. It is one of the only B-Class models to ever be sold in the U.S. market, as well as being the first Mercedes-Benz vehicle to ever be offered in an electric variant, though it was only available in certain states that required ZEV mandates. It was originally rebadged as the B-Class Electric Drive, but in 2017, it was renamed the B250e. Pricing in the U.S. starts at US$41,450 before any applicable tax credits and other government incentives. In 2015, over 1,900 electric B-class vehicles were sold in the US, but in 2017, only 4,100 electric B-class vehicles were sold and were shortly discontinued due to low demand.

The United States Environmental Protection Agency (EPA), under its five-cycle testing, rated the 2014 B-Class Electric Drive with an all-electric range of 87 mi (140 km). The energy consumption was rated at 40 kWh/100 miles for combined city/highway driving, corresponding to a fuel economy of 84 miles per gallon gasoline equivalent – MPGe (2.8 L/100 km; 101 mpg _{imp}). The rating for city driving is 85 mpg-e (2.8 L/100 km; 102 mpg _{imp}), and 83 mpg-e (2.8 L/100 km; 100 mpg _{imp}) for highway.

== Facelift ==
Mercedes had unveiled the facelifted B-Class W246 at the October 2014 Paris Motor Show. The updates were relatively subtle exterior changes, including revised front bumper with larger air ducts, a larger grille with two louvres, redesigned "LED High Performance" headlamps, refreshed rear bumper, and refreshed LED taillamps. The Electric Drive and the Natural Gas models still feature the same headlamp look as the pre-facelift model, however taillamps are refreshed.

The refreshed trims start at the Style model which features two louvres painted in "Iridium Silver" and additional chrome inserts around the car. The interior features Vianen fabric on the seats, while the steering wheel, gear lever and dash switches are decorated with silver chrome accents. The Urban line feature five-spoke alloy wheels, twin exhaust pipes inside of the rear bumper, man-made Artico interior leather and Montfoort fabric, leather steering wheel with perforated grips, contrasting top stitching, and silver chrome accents. AMG Line models are about the same as the previous model.

Ambient lighting is available in 12 colours, and a new head unit display is available. Mass production of this facelifted model had started in November 2014, with its first model year being 2015. Models remained the same in technical data, however model names changed, for example the B 220 CDI had its name replaced simply by the B 220d. The Electric Drive was known as the B 250e, while the fuel cell model was called the B 200f.

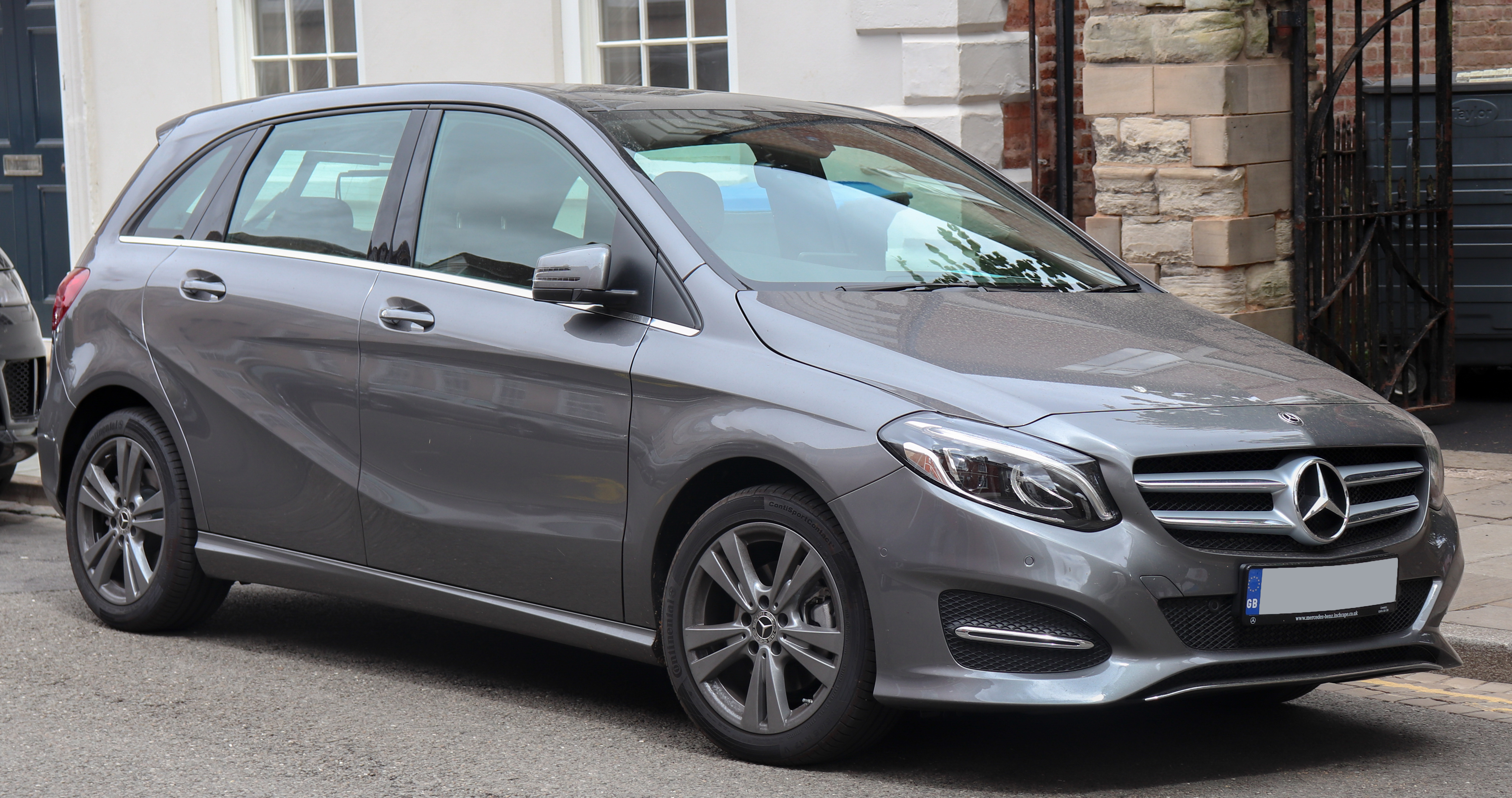
2018 Mercedes-Benz B 220d Exclusive Edition (facelift; UK)

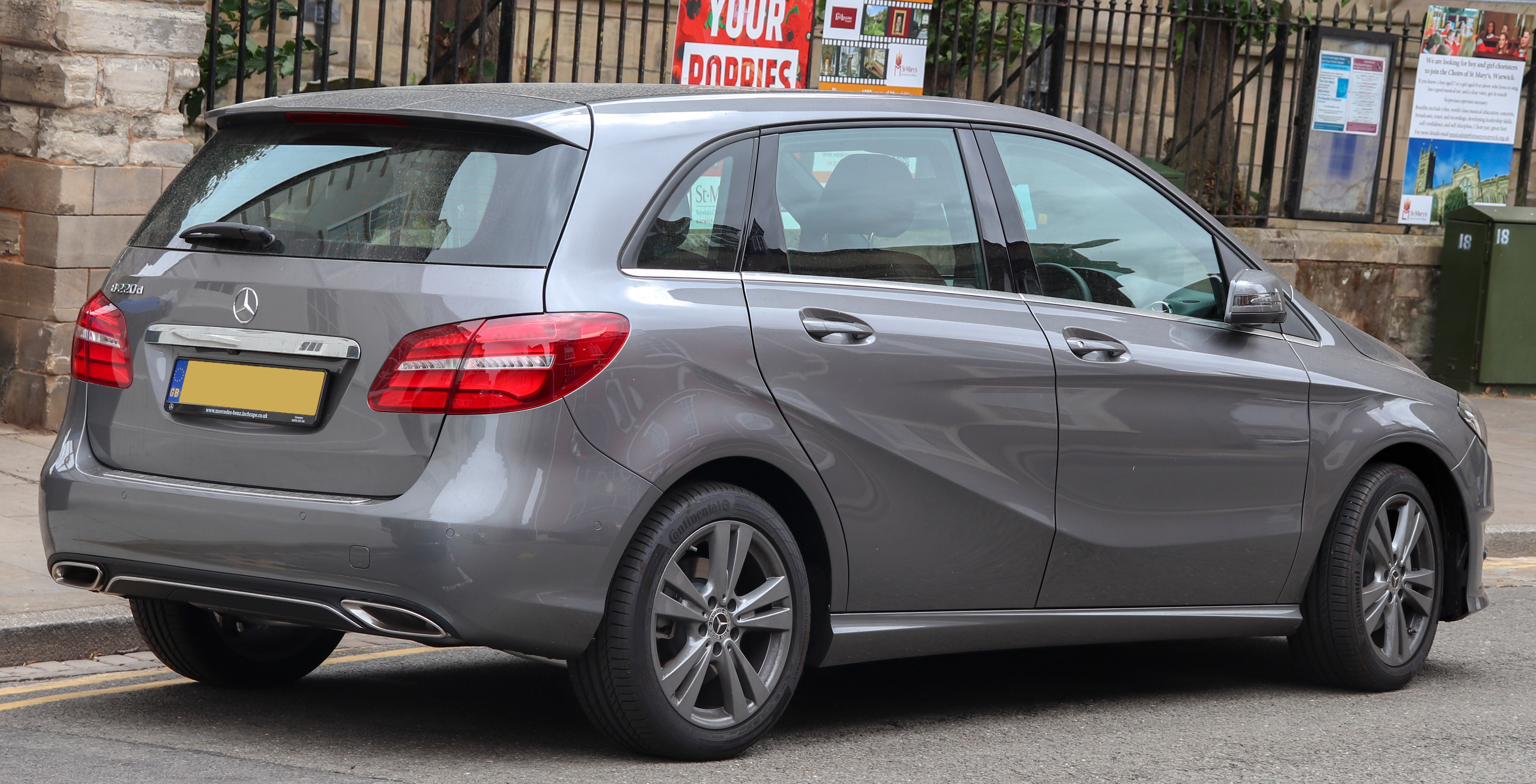
2018 Mercedes-Benz B 220d Exclusive Edition (facelift; UK)

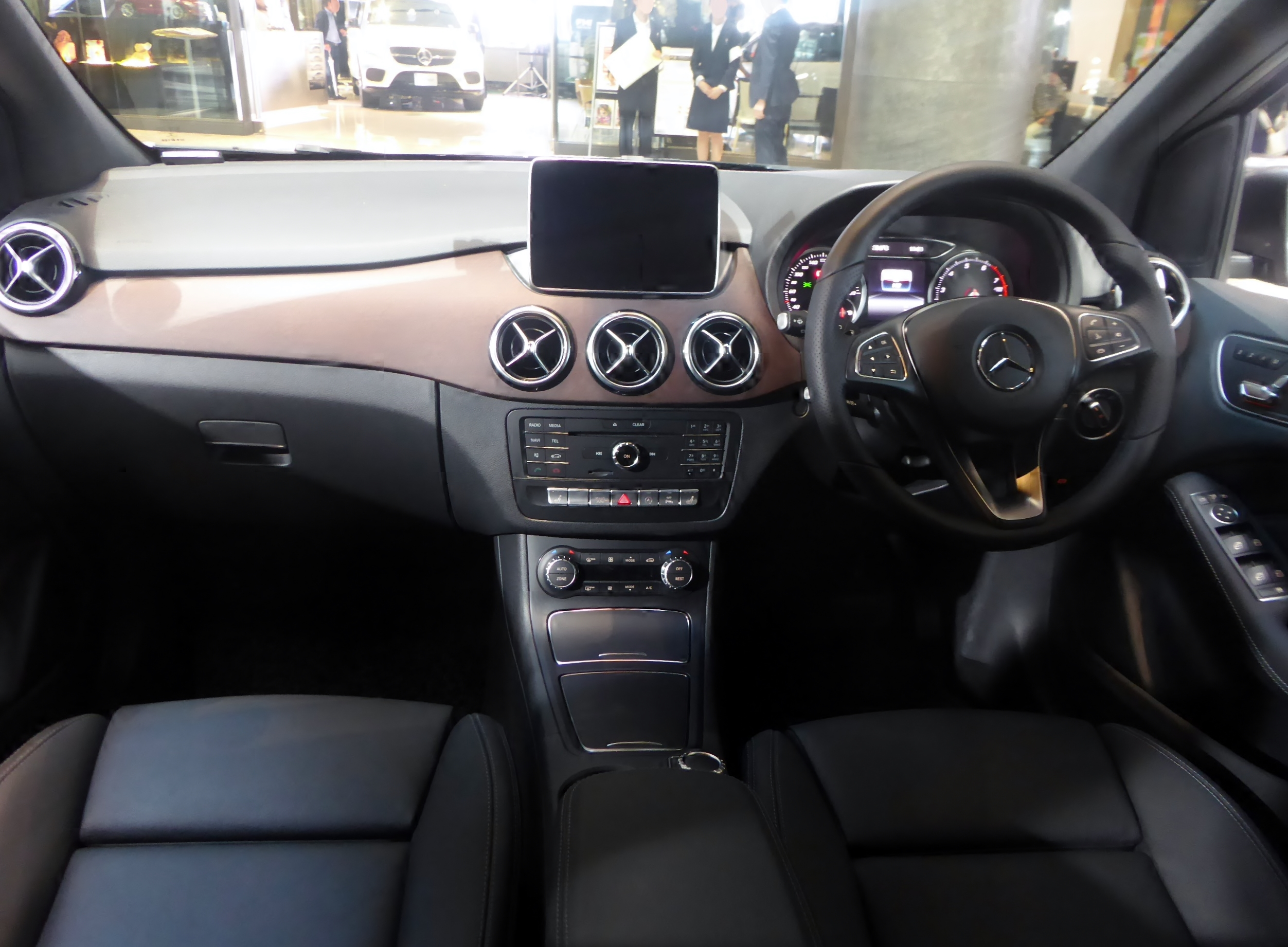
Interior (facelift, Japan)

== Engines ==
Petrol engines
Model	Years	Type	Power, torque at rpm
B 180 BlueEFFICIENCY	2011–2018	1,595 cc (97 cu in) 16V I4 turbo (M 270 DE 16 AL red.)	122 PS (90 kW; 120 hp) at 5,000, 200 N⋅m (148 lb⋅ft) at 1,250–4,000
B 200 BlueEFFICIENCY	2011–2018	1,595 cc (97 cu in) 16V I4 turbo (M 270 DE 16 AL)	156 PS (115 kW; 154 hp) at 5,300, 250 N⋅m (184 lb⋅ft) at 1,250–4,000
B 200 Natural Gas Drive	2013–2018	1,991 cc (121 cu in) 16V I4 turbo (M 270 DE 20 AL)	156 PS (115 kW; 154 hp) at 5,000, 270 N⋅m (199 lb⋅ft) at 1,250–4,000
B 220 4MATIC	2013–2018	1,991 cc (121 cu in) 16V I4 turbo (M 270 DE 20 AL)	184 PS (135 kW; 181 hp) at 5,500, 300 N⋅m (221 lb⋅ft) at 1,200–4,000
B 220 4MATIC BlueEFFICIENCY	2013–2018	1,991 cc (121 cu in) 16V I4 turbo (M 270 DE 20 AL)	184 PS (135 kW; 181 hp) at 5,000, 300 N⋅m (221 lb⋅ft) at 1,250–4,000
B 250 BlueEFFICIENCY	2012–2018	1,991 cc (121 cu in) 16V I4 turbo (M 270 DE 20 AL)	211 PS (155 kW; 208 hp) at 5,500, 350 N⋅m (258 lb⋅ft) at 1,250–4,000

Diesel engines
Model	Years	Type	Power, torque at rpm
B 160 CDI	2013–2018	1,461 cc (89 cu in) I4 turbo (OM 607 DE 15 LA)	90 PS (66 kW; 89 hp) at 4,000, 220 N⋅m (162 lb⋅ft) at 1,750–2,750
B 180 CDI (OM 607)	2013–2018	1,461 cc (89 cu in) I4 turbo (OM 607 DE 15 LA)	109 PS (80 kW; 108 hp) at 4,000, 260 N⋅m (192 lb⋅ft) at 1,750–2,500
B 180 CDI (OM 651)	2013–2018	1,796 cc (110 cu in) I4 turbo (OM 651 DE 18 LA red.)	109 PS (80 kW; 108 hp) at 3,200–4,600, 250 N⋅m (184 lb⋅ft) at 1,400–2,800
B 180 CDI BlueEFFICIENCY	2011–2018	1,796 cc (110 cu in) I4 turbo (OM 651 DE 18 LA red.)	109 PS (80 kW; 108 hp) at 3,200–4,600, 250 N⋅m (184 lb⋅ft) at 1,400–2,800
B 180 CDI BlueEFFICIENCY Edition	2013–2018	1,461 cc (89 cu in) I4 turbo (OM 607 DE 15 LA)	109 PS (80 kW; 108 hp) at 4,000, 260 N⋅m (192 lb⋅ft) at 1,750–2,500
B 200 CDI BlueEFFICIENCY	2011–2018	1,796 cc (110 cu in) I4 turbo (OM 651 DE 18 LA)	136 PS (100 kW; 134 hp) at 3,600–4,400, 300 N⋅m (221 lb⋅ft) at 1,600–3,000
B 220 CDI	2014–2018	2,143 cc (131 cu in) I4 turbo (OM 651 DE 22 LA)	170 PS (125 kW; 168 hp) at 3,400–4,000, 350 N⋅m (258 lb⋅ft) at 1,400–3,400
B 220 CDI BlueEFFICIENCY	2012–2018	2,143 cc (131 cu in) I4 turbo (OM 651 DE 22 LA)	170 PS (125 kW; 168 hp) at 3,400–4,400, 350 N⋅m (258 lb⋅ft) at 1,400–3,400

Electric motors
Model	Years	Type	Power, torque at rpm
B-Class Electric Drive	2014	AC induction motor	179 PS (132 kW; 177 hp) at ?, 340 N⋅m (251 lb⋅ft) at 0

== Safety ==
In a testing conducted in 2011, the W246 B-Class had received an overall five-star rating. The variant tested was a black B200 CDI unit in left-hand drive form, which had a kerb weight of 1,475 kg (3,252 lb). The variant tested was made in November 2011, meaning it was one of the first units to be produced.

Euro NCAP test results Mercedes-Benz B-Class (2011)
Test	Points	%
Overall:	5 /5 stars	
Adult occupant:	35.0	97%
Child occupant:	39.7	81%
Pedestrian:	20.1	56%
Safety assist:	6	86%

ANCAP test results Mercedes-Benz B-Class (2012)
Test	Score
Overall	5 /5 stars
Frontal offset	15.78/16
Side impact	16/16
Pole	2/2
Seat belt reminders	3/3
Whiplash protection	Not Assessed
Pedestrian protection	Not Adequate
Electronic stability control	Standard
