= Drowsy driving =

Operating a motor vehicle while cognitively impaired by lack of sleep

Sleep-deprived driving (commonly known as tired driving, drowsy driving, or fatigued driving) is the operation of a motor vehicle while being cognitively impaired by a lack of sleep. Sleep deprivation is a major cause of motor vehicle accidents, and it can impair the human brain as much as inebriation can. According to a 1998 survey, 23% of adults have fallen asleep while driving. According to the United States Department of Transportation, twice as many male drivers than female drivers admit to have fallen asleep while driving.

In the United States, 250,000 drivers fall asleep at the wheel every day, according to the Division of Sleep Medicine at Harvard Medical School and in a national poll by the National Sleep Foundation, 54% of adult drivers said they had driven while drowsy during the past year with 28% saying they had fallen asleep while driving. According to the National Highway Traffic Safety Administration, drowsy driving is a factor in more than 100,000 crashes, resulting in 6,550 deaths and 80,000 injuries annually in the USA.

When a person does not get an adequate amount of sleep, their ability to function is affected. As listed below, their coordination is impaired, have longer reaction time, impairs judgment, and memory is impaired.

== Effects on driving performance ==
Sleep deprivation has been proven to affect driving ability mainly in four areas:

1. It impairs coordination.
2. It causes longer reaction times.
3. It impairs judgment.
4. It impairs memory and ability to retain information.

Sufficient sleep before driving improves memory. Researchers recorded activity in the hippocampus during learning, and recorded from the same locations during sleep. The results were patterns that occurred during sleep resembled those that occurred during learning, except they were more rapid during sleep. Also, the amount of hippocampal activity during sleep correlated highly with a subsequent improvement in performance. Signs that tell a driver of a need to stop and rest:

1. Difficulty focusing, frequent blinking, or heavy eyelids
2. Daydreaming; wandering/disconnected thoughts
3. Trouble remembering last few miles driven or missing exits and street signs
4. Yawning repeatedly/rubbing eyes
5. Trouble keeping head up
6. Drifting from lane to lane, tailgating, or hitting a shoulder or rumble strip
7. Feeling restless and irritable

== Effects compared to alcohol ==
Numerous studies have found that sleep deprivation can affect driving as much as (and sometimes more than) alcohol. British researchers have found that driving after 17 to 18 hours of being awake is as harmful as driving with a blood alcohol level of .05%, the legal limit in many European countries. The MythBusters TV show dedicated a special episode "Tipsy vs. Tired" to exploring these findings and has confirmed that sleep deprivation can be more dangerous than driving with a BAC over the legal limit.

== Crashes ==
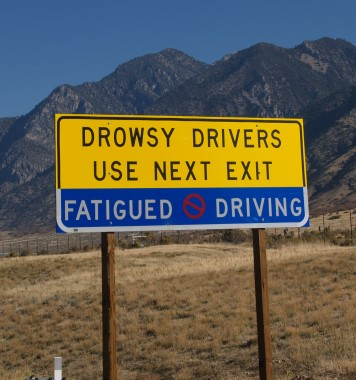
Unique warning sign on Interstate 15 in Utah

A 2017 meta-analysis found that driving while sleepy was associated with being approximately two-and-a-half times as likely to have a motor vehicle collision, with significant heterogeneity between the risk estimates in individual studies. The National Highway Traffic Safety Administration (NHTSA) has estimated that between the years 2011 and 2015, driver drowsiness was involved in approximately 1.4% of all car crashes reported to police in the United States, including 2.0% of crashes that resulted in injuries and 2.4% of crashes that resulted in a death. However, this estimate is based on police reports based on investigations conducted after the crash, and is thought by experts to greatly underestimate the true contribution of sleep-deprived driving to collisions. Between October 2010 and December 2013, researchers at the AAA Foundation conducted a study in which they continuously monitored 3513 drivers from six locations across the United States, using in-vehicle cameras and other equipment to objectively assess driver sleepiness using the PERCLOS measure, which is the percentage of time that the driver's eyes are closed over a defined time period. Of 701 crashes the researchers studied, drowsiness was a factor in 8.8–9.5%, including 10.6–10.8% of crashes that led to significant property damage, deployment of the airbag, or injury. No fatal crashes occurred over the course of the study, however, so the researchers were unable to reliably estimate drowsy driving's contributions to fatalities.

A 2002 fact sheet from the Nebraska Rural Health and Safety Coalition once posted on the Centers for Disease Control website once claimed that collisions related to sleep deprivation are most likely to happen in the early to mid afternoon, and in the very early morning hours. However, several other groups including the AAA Foundation naturalistic studies have found that crashes that occurred in darkness were more than three times as likely to involve driver drowsiness as those that occurred during the day.

The reason that collisions involving drowsy driving are more or less likely to happen at different times of the day may have to do with circadian rhythms (the biological time clock). The biological master clock in the hypothalamus is the suprachiasmatic nucleus or SCN. It provides the main control of the circadian rhythms for sleep, body temperature and other functions. The reason night time driving is so risky is because sleep becomes an irresistible urge especially from about midnight until 6 a.m. A sleepy period is also "programmed" for the afternoon which makes that a risky time.

== Commercial Transportation and Military ==
Sleep-deprived driving is a major problem in commercial transportation and in the military. 20% of commercial pilots and 18% of train operators have admitted to making a serious error due to fatigue. Commercial truck drivers are especially susceptible to drowsy driving. A recent study of 80 long-haul truck drivers in the United States and Canada found that drivers averaged less than 5 hours of sleep per day. The National Transportation Safety Board reported that drowsy driving was likely the cause of more than half of crashes leading to a truck driver's death. For each truck driver fatality, another three to four people are killed. In the fall of 2013 a new law was passed in the USA requiring the Federal Motor Carrier Safety Administration to propose guidelines related to screening for sleep apnea among commercial drivers. The US military estimates that approximately 9% of crashes resulting in death or serious injury during Operation Desert Storm and Operation Desert Shield were caused by sleep-deprived driving.

Sleep deprivation was blamed as a major cause of the Selby rail crash in which 10 people died and 82 were injured.

== Physician reporting ==
Six US states require physicians to report patients who drive while impaired, including those who may be chronically sleep-deprived. Another twenty-five US states permit physicians to violate doctor-patient confidentiality to report sleep-deprived drivers or those with sleeping disorders likely to impair driving, if they so choose. The American Medical Association endorsed physician reporting in 1999. Still, he deferred to the states on whether such notification should be mandatory or permissive. An authority on professional confidentiality, Jacob Appel of New York University, has written that physician reporting is a double-edged sword, because it may deter some patients from seeking care. According to Appel, "Reporting may remove some dangerous drivers from the roads, but if in doing so it actually creates other dangerous drivers, by scaring them away from treatment, then society has sacrificed confidentiality for no tangible return in lives saved."

== Government response ==
Governments had attempted to reduce sleep-deprived driving through education messages and by ingraining roads with dents, known as rumble strips in the US, which cause noise when drivers wander out of their lane. In 2018, the Government of Western Australia introduced a "Driver Reviver" program where drivers can receive free coffee to help them stay awake.

== See also ==
- Driver drowsiness detection
- Highway hypnosis
- National Sleep Foundation
- Sleep driving
