= Somnolence =

State of desire for sleep, for unusually long periods

- Other names: Sleepiness, drowsiness
- Specialty: Psychiatry

Somnolence (alternatively sleepiness or drowsiness) is a state of strong desire for sleep, or sleeping for unusually long periods (compare hypersomnia). It has distinct meanings and causes. It can refer to the usual state preceding falling asleep, the condition of being in a drowsy state due to circadian rhythm disorders, or a symptom of other health problems. It can be accompanied by lethargy, weakness and lack of mental agility.

Somnolence is often viewed as a symptom rather than a disorder by itself. However, the concept of somnolence recurring at certain times for certain reasons constitutes various disorders, such as excessive daytime sleepiness, shift work sleep disorder, and others; and there are medical codes for somnolence as viewed as a disorder.

Sleepiness can be dangerous when performing tasks that require constant concentration, such as driving a vehicle. When a person is sufficiently fatigued, microsleeps may be experienced. In individuals deprived of sleep, somnolence may spontaneously dissipate for short periods of time; this phenomenon is the second wind, and results from the normal cycling of the circadian rhythm interfering with the processes the body carries out to prepare itself to rest.

The word "somnolence" is derived from the Latin "somnus" meaning "sleep".

== Causes ==
A chart with features of the human circadian (24-hour) biological clock

=== Circadian rhythm disorders ===
Circadian rhythm ("biological clock") disorders are a common cause of drowsiness as are a number of other conditions such as sleep apnea, insomnia and narcolepsy. The body clock disorders are classified as extrinsic (externally caused) or intrinsic. The former type is, for example, shift work sleep disorder, which affects people who work nights or rotating shifts. The intrinsic types include:

- Advanced sleep phase disorder (ASPD) – A condition in which patients feel very sleepy and go to bed early in the evening and wake up very early in the morning
- Delayed sleep phase disorder (DSPD) – Faulty timing of sleep, peak period of alertness, the core body temperature rhythm, hormonal and other daily cycles such that they occur a number of hours late compared to the norm, often misdiagnosed as insomnia
- Non-24-hour sleep–wake disorder – A faulty body clock and sleep-wake cycle that usually is longer than (rarely shorter than) the normal 24-hour period causing complaints of insomnia and excessive sleepiness
- Irregular sleep–wake rhythm – Numerous naps throughout the 24-hour period, no main nighttime sleep episode and irregularity from day to day

=== Physical illness ===
Sleepiness can also be a response to infection. Such somnolence is one of several sickness behaviors or reactions to infection that some theorize evolved to promote recovery by conserving energy while the body fights the infection using fever and other means. Other causes include:

- Anxiety
- Brain tumor
- Chronic pains
- Concussion – a mild traumatic brain injury
- Diabetes
- Fibromyalgia
- Head injury
- Hypercalcemia – too much calcium in the blood
- Hypermagnesemia
- Hyponatremia – low blood sodium
- Hypothyroidism – the body doesn't produce enough hormones that control how cells use energy
- Meningitis
- Mood disorders – depression
- Multiple sclerosis
- Narcolepsy – disorder of the nervous system
- Skull fractures
- Sleeping sickness – caused by a specific parasite
- Stress

=== Medicine ===
- Analgesics – mostly prescribed or illicit opiates such as OxyContin or heroin
- Anticonvulsants / antiepileptics – such as phenytoin (Dilantin), carbamazepine (Tegretol), Pregabalin (Lyrica) and Gabapentin (Neurontin)
- Antidepressants – for instance, sedating tricyclic antidepressants amitriptyline and mirtazapine. Somnolence is less common with SSRIs and SNRIs as well as MAOIs.
- Antihistamines – for instance, diphenhydramine (Benadryl, Nytol), doxylamine (Unisom-2), hydroxyzine (Atarax) and promethazine (Phenergan)
- Typical antipsychotics - for example levomepromazine, chlorpromazine
- Antipsychotics – for example, thioridazine, quetiapine (Seroquel), olanzapine (Zyprexa), risperidone and ziprasidone (Geodon) but not haloperidol
- Dopamine agonists used in the treatment of Parkinson's disease – e.g. pergolide, ropinirole and pramipexole.
- HIV medications – such as efavirenz
- Hypertension medications – such as amlodipine
- Hypnotics, or soporific drugs, commonly known as sleeping pills.
- Tranquilizers – such as zopiclone (Zimovane), or the benzodiazepines such as diazepam (Valium) or nitrazepam (Mogadon) and the barbiturates, such as amobarbital (Amytal) or secobarbital (Seconal)
- Other agents impacting the central nervous system in sufficient or toxic doses

== Assessment ==
Quantifying sleepiness requires a careful assessment. The diagnosis depends on two factors, namely chronicity and reversibility. Chronicity signifies that the patient, unlike healthy people, experiences persistent sleepiness which does not pass. Reversibility stands for the fact that, even if the individual goes to sleep, the sleepiness may not be completely gone after waking up. The problem with the assessment is that patients may only report the consequences of sleepiness: loss of energy, fatigue, weariness, difficulty remembering or concentrating, etc. It is crucial to aim for objective measures to quantify the sleepiness. Measurement scales of sleepiness include:

- Multiple sleep latency test (MSLT). It assesses the sleep onset latency during the course of one day—often from 8:00 to 16:00. An average sleep onset latency of less than 5 minutes is an indication of pathological sleepiness.
- Karolinska Sleepiness Scale

== Severity ==
A number of diagnostic tests, including the Epworth Sleepiness Scale, are available to help ascertain the seriousness and likely causes of abnormal somnolence.

== See also ==
- The dictionary definition of drowsiness at Wiktionary
- Chronic fatigue syndrome
- Decision fatigue
- Fibromyalgia
- Insomnia
- Hypersomnia
- Dyssomnia
- Fatigue
- Narcolepsy
- Postprandial somnolence
- Restless legs syndrome
- Periodic limb movement disorder
- Hypnopompic
- Hypnagogia
- Sleep apnea
