= Public Law 113-45 =

Federal regulation of the Motor Carrier Safety Administration

- Long title: To ensure that any new or revised requirement providing for the screening, testing, or treatment of individuals operating commercial motor vehicles for sleep disorders is adopted pursuant to a rulemaking proceeding, and for other purposes.
- Announced in: the 113th United States Congress
- Sponsored by: Rep. Larry Bucshon (R-IN)
- Number of co-sponsors: 9

Citations
- Public law: Pub. L. 113–45 (text) (PDF)

Codification
- Agencies affected: United States Department of Transportation

Legislative history
- Introduced in the House as H.R. 3095 by Rep. Larry Bucshon (R-IN) on September 12, 2013; Committee consideration by United States House Committee on Transportation and Infrastructure, United States House Transportation Subcommittee on Highways and Transit; Passed the House on September 26, 2013 (Roll Call Vote 486: 405-0); Passed the Senate on October 4, 2013 (Unanimous consent); Signed into law by President Barack Obama on October 15, 2013

Public Law 113-45 (formerly H.R. 3095) is a U.S. federal law that requires that the Federal Motor Carrier Safety Administration go through the standard rulemaking proceeding, allowing comment from the public and the trucking industry, before it sets any requirements for truck drivers related to sleep apnea. It was introduced in the United States House of Representatives during the 113th United States Congress and was signed into law by President Barack Obama in October 2013.

The law does not make any rulings about what the FMCSA should decide regarding trucking and sleep apnea, but does require the FMCSA to use the formal rulemaking process instead of simply issuing guidance.

== Provisions of the bill ==
The law gives the U.S. Department of Transportation the authority to require screening and treatment of commercial truck drivers for sleep disorders, including sleep apnea, as long as the agency follows certain procedures.

The Federal Motor Carrier Safety Administration (FMCSA) is the agency within the United States Department of Transportation that would be affected by this bill and would have the responsibility to initiate a rulemaking proceeding.

== Congressional Budget Office report ==
H.R. 3095 requires the FMCSA to complete a formal rulemaking process if the agency decides to establish requirements for commercial truckers to address certain sleep disorders among drivers. Under current law, the agency could issue such requirements without going through a formal rulemaking process by issuing guidance to trucking companies.

The Congressional Budget Office (CBO) estimated that the law would not have a significant effect on the federal budget. After passage of the law, FMCSA announced that it would go through the federal rule making process to develop specific rules on this issue. CBO estimated that the bill would not affect revenues or direct spending; therefore, pay-as-you-go procedures do not apply.

H.R. 3095 contains no intergovernmental or private-sector mandates as defined in the Unfunded Mandates Reform Act and would not affect the budgets of state, local, or tribal governments.

== Procedural history ==
H.R. 3095 was introduced into the House on September 12, 2013 by Rep. Larry Bucshon (R-IN). It was referred to the United States House Committee on Transportation and Infrastructure and the United States House Transportation Subcommittee on Highways and Transit. On September 20, 2013, House Majority Leader Eric Cantor announced that H.R. 3095 would be on the legislative schedule for the week of September 23. It was scheduled to be considered under a suspension of the rules on September 25, 2013. The House voted in Roll Call Vote 486 on September 26, 2013 to pass the bill 405-0. The Senate then voted to pass the bill by unanimous consent on October 4, 2013. President Barack Obama signed the bill into law on October 15, 2013 and it became Pub. L. 113–45 (text) (PDF).

== Debate and discussion ==
Representative Bucshon stated that he sponsored the bill in reaction to the FMCSA's initial intention to avoid industry comment on its proposal to issue guidance that all drivers be tested for sleep apnea. Bucshon also indicated that he was concerned that if the FMCSA only issued informal guidance instead of using the formal rulemaking process, it would open trucking companies up to lawsuits. The House Republican Conference favors the legislation because it would "ensure that a new regulation under consideration by the Federal Motor Carrier Safety Administration undergoes an open and transparent rulemaking process." Other supporters argued that using the rulemaking process instead of guidance would give stakeholders more input into the process by allowing them to submit comments.

According to the American Trucking Associations (ATA) there are over three million truckers. Other sources say there are "more than 4.6 million truck and bus drivers in the U.S." If the average sleep apnea test costs $2,200, as Rep. Bucshon stated, the total cost of testing could be over $1 billion for the trucking industry. Bucshon and President Bill Graves of the ATA both argue that the trucking industry should be able to comment on the FMCSA's proposal and have the process go through a normal rule making procedure. This law prevents the FMCSA from circumventing the normal rule making procedure.

The American Trucking Associations and the Owner-Operator Independent Drivers Association both supported the bill.

The Truckload Carriers Association also believes that the FMCSA should use the rulemaking procedure instead of issuing regulatory guidance. The organization adopted a policy on March 3, 2013, that said "The development of any future regulation on establishing objective standards for sleep disorder screening, testing and treatment should be focused on conditions that pose a substantially elevated crash risk based on sound data and analysis, be cost-beneficial, and promote effective treatments that minimize the impact to motor carriers and commercial vehicle operators."

The FMCSA argues that testing for sleep apnea is necessary because sleep apnea affects daytime alertness and performance and studies have shown that "people with untreated sleep apnea have an increased risk of being involved in a fatigue-related motor vehicle crash." The FMCSA also points to a recent study it sponsored that found that "28 percent of commercial truck drivers have mild to severe sleep apnea."

== See also ==
- List of bills in the 113th United States Congress
- Federal Motor Carrier Safety Administration
- American Trucking Associations
- Sleep apnea
- Trucking industry in the United States
