= The T.J. Hooper =

American legal decision

THE T. J. HOOPER; THE NORTHERN NO. 30 AND NO. 17; THE MONTROSE; In re EASTERN TRANSP. CO.; NEW ENGLAND COAL & COKE CO. v. NORTHERN BARGE CORPORATION; H. N. HARTWELL & SON, Inc., v. SAME.
- Court: United States Court of Appeals for the Second Circuit
- Full case name: The T.J. Hooper
- Decided: July 21 1932
- Citations: The T. J. Hooper, 60 F.2d 737, 1932 U.S. App. LEXIS 2592

Court membership
- Judges sitting: Learned Hand, Thomas Walter Swan, Augustus Noble Hand

Case opinions
- Majority: Hand, joined by Swan, Hand

The T.J. Hooper, 60 F.2d 737 (2d. Cir. 1932) is a 1932 admiralty law decision of the United States Court of Appeals for the Second Circuit. The case is commonly known by the name of one of the vessels involved.

== Background ==
In March 1928, two barges, belonging to the Northern Barge Company, had lifted cargoes of coal at Norfolk, Virginia, for New York. They were towed by tugboats, the "Montrose" and the "Hooper," and were lost off the Jersey Coast on March tenth, in an easterly gale.

As a result, the cargo owners sued the barges, the owner of the barges sued the tugs, and the owner of the tug filed a petition to limit its liability.

== Ruling ==
Judge Learned Hand wrote the majority opinion for the court; he stated that even though there was not a custom for these ships to be equipped with a radio at the time, it was unreasonable for them not to.
