= Psychomotor vigilance task =

Psychometric test of attention

Task Performance and Analysis
- MeSH: D013647

A psychomotor vigilance task (PVT) is a sustained-attention, reaction-timed task that measures the consistency with which subjects respond to a visual stimulus. Research indicates increased sleep debt or sleep deficit correlates with deteriorated alertness, slower problem solving, declined psychomotor skills, and increased rate of false responses.

Use of PVT tests was championed by David F. Dinges and popularized by its ease of scoring, simple metrics, and convergent validity. However, it was shown that motivation can counteract the detrimental effects of sleep loss for up to 36 hours.

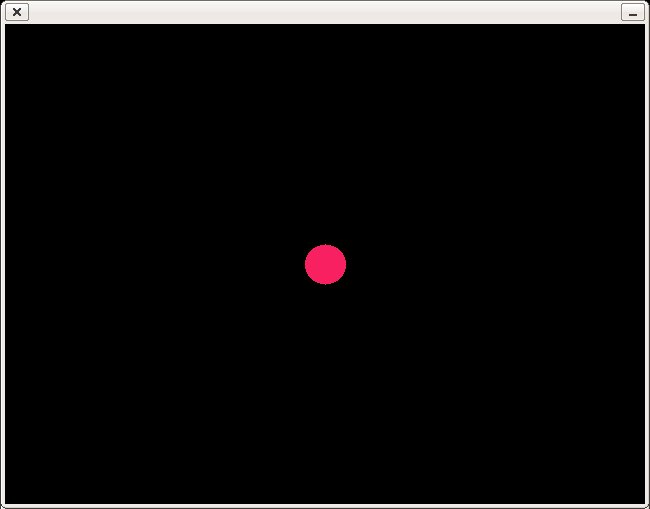
Screen shot of PEBL's Perceptual Vigilance Test

== How it works ==
The PVT is a simple task where the subject presses a button as soon as the light appears. The light will turn on randomly every few seconds for 5–10 minutes. The main measurement of this task is not to assess the reaction time (mental chronometry), but rather to see how many times the button is not pressed when the light is on. The purpose of the PVT is to measure sustained attention, and give a numerical measure of sleepiness by counting the number of lapses in attention of the tested subject.

== Where it has been used ==
The Psychomotor Vigilance Self Test on the International Space Station (Reaction Self Test) provides the crewmembers with feedback on neurobehavioral changes in vigilant attention, state stability, and impulsivity. It aids crewmembers to objectively identify when their performance capability is degraded by various fatigue-related conditions that can occur as a result of ISS operations and time in space (e.g., acute and chronic sleep restriction, slam shifts, extravehicular activity (EVA), and residual sedation from sleep medications). The test is ideal for use in space flight because unlike other cognitive tests, it is brief while being free of learning effects and aptitude difference that make interpretation of other measures difficult, as it has been successfully deployed in three NASA missions.

== Research ==
Kaul et al. found that meditation acutely improves psychomotor vigilance, and may decrease sleep need.

== See also ==
- Psychological testing
- Psychometrics
