= Karolinska Sleepiness Scale =

9-point subjective sleepiness assessment scale

- Purpose: Subjective assessment of sleepiness
- Developed by: Torbjörn Åkerstedt and Mats Gillberg
- Year created: 1990
- Format: Self-report (1 = extremely alert to 9 = very sleepy)
- Related tools: Epworth Sleepiness Scale, Sleep diary

The Karolinska Sleepiness Scale (KSS) is a 9-point subjective scale used to assess a person's current level of sleepiness or alertness. It asks respondents to rate how sleepy or alert they feel at the moment (e.g. over the past 10 minutes) on a scale from 1 to 9. The scale is situational (a "state" measure), meaning it reflects sleepiness at a particular time and can change hour by hour. It was developed by Torbjörn Åkerstedt and Mats Gillberg at the Karolinska Institute in Sweden. Because of its simplicity and sensitivity to changes, KSS is used in sleep and fatigue research.

== History ==
The KSS was introduced by Åkerstedt and Gillberg in 1990 as a unidimensional sleepiness rating scale. In their original work it was validated against brain electrical activity: higher KSS scores (more sleepiness) were strongly associated with increases in EEG alpha/theta power and slow eye movements. Over time, it became popular for tracking short-term changes in alertness during sleep studies, shift work experiments, and fatigue research.

There are two versions of KSS: one with labels on every point and one with labels only on alternate points; studies have found the two versions yield essentially the same results.

== Scale ==
The KSS is scored from 1 (extremely alert) to 9 (very sleepy) with intermediate descriptors. Each number corresponds to a verbal description of alertness level. In one commonly used version, the labels are:

- 1 = extremely alert
- 2 = very alert
- 3 = alert
- 4 = rather alert
- 5 = neither alert nor sleepy
- 6 = some signs of sleepiness
- 7 = sleepy but no effort to keep awake
- 8 = sleepy and some effort to keep awake
- 9 = very sleepy, great effort to keep awake, fighting sleep

Higher KSS scores indicate greater sleepiness. In practice, KSS ratings are often collected repeatedly (e.g. hourly) to monitor how sleepiness changes over time. Typical findings are that KSS scores rise with longer wakefulness and vary with the time of day (reflecting circadian rhythm)
