= Start school later movement =

Effort to delay school hours to improve students' health

In the United States, the start school later movement is an interdisciplinary effort by health professionals, students, parents, and educators to shift school hours later. It bases its claims on a growing body of evidence that starting middle and high schools too early in the morning is unhealthy for teenagers. Since the second half of the 20th century, most public schools in the United States have started high school around 8:00 a.m., in some cases as early at 7:00 a.m. Before that, schools rarely began before 8:30 or 9 a.m. According to the CDC, school should begin no earlier than 8:30 a.m. for middle and high school students.

Advocates of a return to later school start times argue that sleep is a public health issue. They say that early school start times cause widespread sleep deprivation among teenagers as well as physical, psychological, and educational problems. Not only do students consistently get significantly more sleep on school nights when their schools move to later start times, but later school hours have been linked with improved school performance, reduced impulsiveness, and greater motivation. They also cause lower rates of depression, tardiness, truancy, and morning automobile accidents. Studies from 2011 suggest that early school start times disproportionately hurt economically disadvantaged students and may even negatively impact future earning potential of students, offsetting any financial savings to the school system attributed to earlier hours. Therefore, many schools and two entire US states have implemented later school start times.

== Context ==
Since the rise of suburbs in the mid-20th century, most public secondary schools in the US have started around 8:00 a.m., and some start as early as 7:00 a.m. This is done for three reasons: it allows school districts to use the same fleet of buses and drivers for different grade levels, it allows older students to care for or transport younger siblings after school, and it avoids rush-hour traffic around 8:30 a.m. The CDC recommends that middle and high schools start at 8:30 a.m. or later, but less than 20% of such schools currently follow this guideline.

== Origins ==
In the early 1990s, the University of Minnesota's landmark School Start Time Study tracked high school students from two Minneapolis-area districts – Edina, a suburban district that changed its opening hour from 7:20 a.m. to 8:30 a.m. and the Minneapolis Public Schools, which changed their opening from 7:20 a.m. to 8:40 a.m. Many positive benefits to students were found, including:

- Improved attendance and enrollment rates
- Less sleeping in class
- Less student-reported depression
- Fewer student visits to school counselors for behavioral and peer issues
- More even temperament at home

A longitudinal follow-up study of the Minneapolis Public Schools after five years revealed that these and other positive benefits had persisted. In 2014, a three-year project using data from more than 9,000 students attending eight high schools in three states, found that when schools switched to a start time of 8:30 a.m. or later, attendance, standardized test scores and academic performance improved, and tardiness, substance abuse, symptoms of depression, consumption of caffeinated drinks, and the rate of traffic accidents involving teen drivers decreased.

Since the 1990s over 250 individual schools or districts in 45 states have delayed their start times, and scores of others are considering a change at any given time. Despite sporadic reform efforts on the part of educators, public health officials, legislators, and grassroots groups, however, most American middle and high schools still require students to begin instruction prior to 8:30 a.m. Failure of efforts to delay start times over the years has primarily been due to pushback from community members who fear that a shift to later school hours will be prohibitively expensive and/or disrupt after-school sports and other extracurricular schedules, student jobs, daycare arrangement, teacher training, or time for homework.

== Shifted circadian rhythms and sleep deprivation ==
Proponents of a return to later school hours cite abundant evidence that starting middle and high school before about 8:30 or 9 a.m. is incompatible with the biological clocks of teenagers and young adults. In 1993, a team led by Mary Carskadon, PhD, of Brown University showed that changes in circadian biology during puberty drive a "sleep-phase delay," a shift in the sleep-wake patterns of adolescents that leads them to fall asleep and wake up later than younger and older people. Subsequent studies have confirmed these findings, explored the impact of school start times on the sleep needs and patterns of adolescents., and demonstrated a "phase shift" in the release of melatonin at puberty, which appears to be involved in shifting the sleep-wake cycle several hours later during the adolescent years. This same shift to a delayed phase in the release of melatonin during puberty has also been seen in other mammals.

The shifted circadian rhythms associated with puberty make it difficult, if not impossible, for many teenagers—who may have to rise at 5 or 6 a.m. to get ready and commute to school in time for 7 a.m. school bells—to get sufficient sleep on school nights. Even discounting for the distractions of homework, extracurricular demands, and electronics, most adolescents find it difficult to fall asleep before about 11 p.m. or rise before about 8 a.m. In addition, they need to sleep in until 8 a.m. or so to get the 9 or more hours of sleep that most sleep research suggests they need. As a result, many teenagers arrive at school sleep-deprived. The most recent data from the Youth Risk Behavior Survey show that 70% of American high school students are sleep-deprived and about 40% get six or fewer hours of sleep per night.

A study in the Minneapolis Public School District in 1997-1998 demonstrated that multiple sleep deprivation effects could be alleviated by delaying school start times. Factors such as attendance especially increased. Also, there was a decrease in disciplinary problems, indicating that chronic sleep debt also drove behavioral issues amongst the student population.

== Health impacts of early school hours ==
Later school starts are associated with increased sleep for students. According to the CDC students who do not receive the appropriate amount of sleep are at an increased risk of health issues. Almost 70% of teens reportedly do not get enough sleep and there are reported increases in stimulant abuse, weight gain, diabetes, immune disorders, mood swings, depression, and suicidal ideation, as well as reduced impulse control. Early school start times have been associated with drowsy driving in new teen drivers and higher car crash rates. Schools ending early in the afternoon may also increase the risk of engaging in unhealthy, risky behaviors among sleep-deprived adolescents. Sending children to school before sunrise on fall or winter mornings may require them to wait or walk in cold, dark weather, with low visibility.

== Impact on school performance ==
Sleep deprivation can result in low motivation, difficulty concentrating, restlessness, slowed reaction times, lack of energy, frequent errors, forgetfulness, and impaired decision-making skills. Studies by Kyla Wahlstrom at University of Minnesota's Center for Applied Research and Educational Improvement (CAREI) have tied these effects to early school start times, which, in turn, have repeatedly been linked to increased rates of tardiness, truancy, absenteeism, and dropping out. In 2012, a study using data from Wake County, North Carolina, showed that delaying middle school start times by one hour, from roughly 7:30 to 8:30, increases standardized test scores by at least two percentile points in math and one percentile point in reading. The effect was largest for students with below-average test scores, suggesting that later start times would narrow gaps in student achievement.

A study in the United Kingdom delayed a school's starting bell to 10:00 a.m. for two years then reverted back to an 8:50 a.m. start time. In the years when the start time was 10:00, the school experienced statistically significant improvements in attendance and student performance. When students were returned to 8:50 start times, the school experienced a decrease in performance. This study indicates that even though school start times would benefit students later than 8:50, even more positive outcomes could be reached after 10:00 AM.

Other studies have indicated that school start times may not be the only solution to improving cognitive functioning during the early hours of school. One alternative is to restructure class schedules in which morning classes are focused on fluency based skills instead of implicit memory skills that are shown to be stronger for adolescents later in the day.

== Equity ==
The impact of later start times on school performance—including reduced truancy, absenteeism, and increased overall academic achievement—is approximately double in economically disadvantaged students. This discrepancy may be explained, at least in part, by the fact that privileged students have opportunities to attend private schools (most of which start instruction after 8 a.m.) and/or save time by driving or being driven to school.

Studies of relationships between sleep problems, socioeconomic status, and negative developmental outcomes in youth indicated that students with lower socioeconomic statuses were more disproportionately affected by stress response system issues, emotional regulation issues, and cognitive functioning issues. Longer and better quality sleep may be protective against socio-emotional and cognitive challenges for low-income youth.

== Impact on adults ==
Students are not the only ones to benefit from sleeping in. After new school start times were implemented in a large suburban district near Denver, more parents of middle and high school students reported sufficient sleep duration, and fewer reported feeling tired. Middle and high school teachers reported later wake times, increased sleep duration, and improved daytime performance. The high school teachers said this profoundly changed their lives, allowing them to be a more effective teacher.

== Economic impact ==
Delaying school start times to 8:30 a.m. is a cost-effective, population-level strategy that would significantly impact public health and the U.S. economy, with benefits quickly outweighing any immediate costs. After just two years, the study conservatively projected a gain of $8.6 billion to the U.S. economy. After a decade, this gain would increase to $83 billion, and after 15 years to $140 billion, amounting to an average annual gain to the U.S. economy of $9.3 billion.

On the individual district level, delaying school start times could decrease transportation costs. Using an optimizing algorithm to create staggered bus schedules resulted in a $5 million decrease in funding for transportation.

== Controversy ==
Critics of delaying school start times point out that delaying school start times can have negative economic effects on school districts, the community, and families if not strategically planned. Most school districts stagger start times for different grade levels because they can reuse the same buses (and drivers) for different levels. Moving high school hours later would require more buses. In addition, it would be more difficult for older siblings to pick up their younger siblings from school (which is important in working-class families). In California, when the law was passed, it was quite difficult for some working-class parents. Many critics of delaying school start times point to school start times merely delaying when students choose to sleep instead of increasing sleep time. However, a 2010 study found that students' overall sleep times increased significantly after a half-hour delay in start times. Before the shifted schedule only 16.4% of students reached 8 hours of sleep; after the implementation of the delayed start time 54.7% of students reached 8 hours of sleep. When Seattle Public Schools moved start times later in the 2018-19 school year, high school students received 34 more minutes of sleep on average. In summary, delaying school start times results in 30 minutes of additional sleep, which is beneficial.

== Calls for reform ==
As early as 1993, sleep researchers and healthcare leaders began encouraging school administrators to move middle and high school hours to 8:30 a.m. or later. In the past two decades, numerous health, educational, and civic leaders have been calling for a return to later, healthier school start times, including former U.S. Education Secretary Arne Duncan, the National Sleep Foundation, and the National Institutes of Health. In 2014 the American Academy of Pediatrics issued a policy statement recommending that middle and high schools start no earlier than 8:30 a.m. as an effective means of addressing the serious public health issue of insufficient sleep in adolescents, a position echoed in 2015 by the Centers for Disease Control and Prevention and in 2016 by the American Medical Association, and supported by the American Academy of Child and Adolescent Psychiatry, the American Thoracic Society, the National Association of School Nurses, and the Society of Pediatric Nurses. The National Education Association issued a resolution supporting school schedules that follow research-based recommendations regarding the sleep patterns of age groups. Several state medical societies have issued position statements or resolutions supporting later school start times, as have both the Washington and Virginia state Parent Teachers Associations (PTAs) and the Seattle Educators Association. A move to a later school start time is also consistent with the Healthy People 2020 Objective to increase the proportion of students in grades 9 to 12 who get sufficient sleep.

The Fairfax County (Virginia) Public Schools (FCPS) Board of Education passed a resolution in April 2012 affirming their goal to find ways to start county high schools after 8 a.m. to allow students to get sufficient sleep, a resolution supported by the Washington Post's editorial board. In June 2013 FCPS contracted a team from the Children’s National Medical Center's Division of Sleep Medicine to partner with Fairfax County students, parents, educators, administrators, and other community stakeholders to develop a plan to accomplish this task. This effort led the Washington Post's editorial board to endorse later school start times as a "smarter way to start high schoolers' days" in August 2013. This editorial was tweeted by U.S. Education Secretary Arne Duncan along with the comment that starting high school later and letting teens sleep more was a "common sense" way "to improve student achievement that too few have implemented." As new school superintendent Karen Garza laid out her vision for the district in September 2013, she vowed to push for later school start times. On October 1, 2013, Montgomery County, MD School Superintendent Joshua Starr recommended that high school start times be moved 50 minutes to 8:15 a.m., with a proposed start in the 2015–16 school year.

In England, the Sleep and Circadian Neurosciences Institute (SCNi) at the University of Oxford began a study in 2015 involving sleep education for teenagers in England and Wales. Professors Russell Foster and Colin Espie with their project "Teensleep" will assess whether ten half-hour lessons in year 10 will improve academic performance and well-being. Taught by specially trained teachers, the lessons introduce scientific theory on the importance of sleep and the effects of sleep deprivation as well as techniques for stress management. The study has been redesigned since it was originally announced; it was previously considerably more ambitious, including a later start time at about twenty-five schools, sleep education in others, both in some schools and neither in others. Students will be evaluated before and after the sleep education periods.

== Grassroots advocacy ==
Community groups have sporadically arisen in various school communities since the 1990s, sometimes prompting studies and reform proposals but often dying out as concerned, active families grew out of the system. Probably the most visible and longest lasting of the grassroots advocacy groups is SLEEP in Fairfax County, Virginia, which was formed in 2004 to increase awareness of teen sleep needs and to change middle and high school start times in the Fairfax County Public Schools (FCPS) to later in the morning. More recently, social media tools have allowed once isolated advocates to unite efforts and share resources. In fall 2011, an online petition by Maryland-based science writer and education advocate Terra Ziporyn Snider effort galvanized a national non-profit organization, Start School Later, a coalition of health professionals, sleep scientists, educators, parents, students, and other concerned citizens dedicated to increasing public awareness about the relationship between sleep and school hours and to ensuring school start times compatible with health, safety, education, and equity. Active petition drives in 2012 and 2013 among the coalition's Washington DC Metro area chapters have spurred several counties to re-open their discussions and helped spearhead a study group to reconsider the issue in the Montgomery County Public Schools. Start School Later also maintains a website with links to references and other educational materials on sleep and school start times, and in 2013 partnered with The Lloyd Society to co-sponsor an educational symposium featuring keynote speaker Judith Owens, MD, MPH, Director of Sleep Medicine at the Children's National Medical Center, whose research interests include the neurobehavioral and health consequences of sleep problems in children, pharmacologic treatment of pediatric sleep disorders, and cultural and psychosocial issues that impact sleep. Many advocates also support campaigns using materials from California attorney Dennis Nolan's website, an exhaustive and frequently updated compilation of research about adolescent sleep deprivation and its relationship to early school start times. In spring 2013 the Mayo Clinic updated its online information about teen sleep to recognize grassroots efforts to start school at later times in sync with the internal clocks of adolescents.

== Legislation ==
California Congresswoman Zoe Lofgren has repeatedly introduced versions of a "ZZZ's to A's" Bill and Resolution to the U.S. Congress since 1998, all proposing limits on the hours at which American high schools can begin required instruction. As of the 118th Congress, all efforts to pass legislation have died in committee including the most recent attempt to pass the bill in 2022.

As of April 2025, legislatures in 28 US states and territories had introduced laws to study, incentivize, or require later school start times. At least 13 of these bills have passed, including the California, Florida, Maryland, Virginia, Hawaii, Indiana, Tennessee, Minnesota, New Jersey, Maine, Pennsylvania, Rhode Island, South Carolina, Utah, Washington, Nevada, and Massachusetts legislatures. In 2014 Maryland was the first state to pass school start time legislation via HB 883, sponsored by Delegate Aruna Miller (D, Montgomery County) and passed unanimously by the Maryland General Assembly. This legislation required the state Department of Health and Mental Hygiene to conduct a study on student sleep needs, explore ways school systems can shift hours to accommodate them, and develop recommendations about whether state public schools should adopt a policy of start times at 8 a.m. or later, resulting in the "Report on Safe and Healthy School Hours". Two years later the Maryland state legislature passed the Orange Ribbon Bill for Healthy School Hours, also sponsored by Delegate Miller, a voluntary, no-cost, incentive program recognizing districts for implementing evidence-based school hours. In 2015 New Jersey passed a law (S2484) requiring the state Department of Education to study the options and benefits of starting school later at middle and high schools and recommend whether the state should establish a pilot program to test later school start times in select middle schools and high schools throughout the state. A 2017 California bill introduced by Senator Anthony J. Portantino that would have prevented state middle and high schools from requiring attendance before 8:30 a.m. was passed by the state legislature in 2018 but vetoed by Governor Jerry Brown. The bill, slightly modified and reintroduced in 2019 and co-sponsored by Start School Later and the California State PTA, was passed by the legislature in September 2019 and signed into law by Governor Gavin Newsom, making California the first state in the nation to set a floor on how early schools can require attendance. Florida passed similar legislation in 2023, which would later be repealed in May 2025.

=== California ===
In 2019, the California State Legislature passed a law and became the first state in the nation to set hard limits on school hours. Since 2022, middle schools and high schools are required to start no earlier than 8:00 a.m. and 8:30 a.m., respectively. Many advocates celebrated this victory as a huge achievement for the movement; however, some people have criticized the law for being unsustainable for working parents and/or school districts.
