= Polyphasic sleep =

Sleep pattern with more than one period of sleep in a 24-hour period

Polyphasic sleep or segmented sleep is the system of sleeping during multiple periods over the course of 24 hours, in contrast to monophasic sleep, a single period of sleep within 24 hours. Polyphasic usually means more than two periods of sleep, as distinct from biphasic (or diphasic, bifurcated, or bimodal) sleep, meaning two periods of sleep. The term polyphasic sleep was first used in the early 20th century by psychologist J. S. Szymanski, who observed daily fluctuations in activity patterns.

While today monophasic sleep is the norm, historical analysis suggests that polyphasic nighttime sleep was common practice across societies before industrialization. Scientific experiments and observational studies have supported a theory of biphasic sleep in humans. Polyphasic sleep is common in many animals, and is believed to be the ancestral sleep state for mammals, although simians are monophasic.

A common practice of biphasic sleep is a nap, a short period of daytime sleep in addition to nighttime sleep. An example of involuntary polyphasic sleep is the circadian rhythm disorder irregular sleep–wake syndrome.

The term polyphasic sleep is also used by an online community that experiments with alternative sleeping schedules in an attempt to increase productivity. There is no scientific evidence that this practice is effective or beneficial.

== Historical examples ==
Typical monophasic sleep pattern

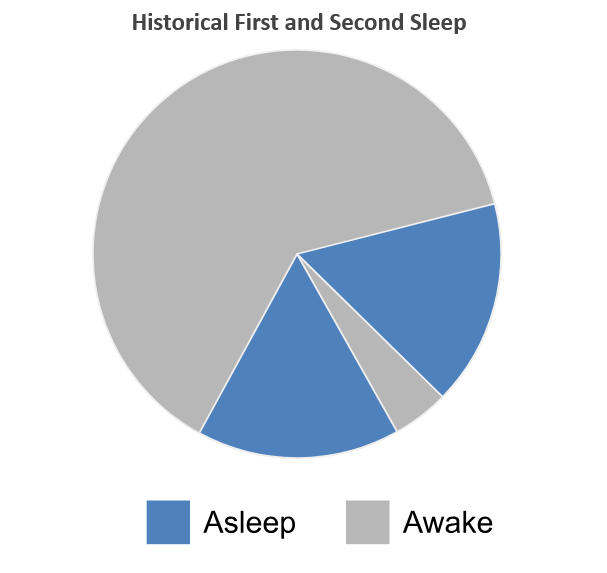
Suggested historical "first and second sleep" biphasic pattern

Mid-day nap biphasic sleep pattern

Biphasic sleep (also referred to as segmented sleep, or bimodal sleep) is a pattern of sleep which is divided into two segments, or phases, in a 24-hour period.

=== First sleep and second sleep ===
One biphasic sleep pattern, sometimes described as segmented sleep, involved sleeping in two phases, separated by about an hour of wakefulness. This pattern was common in preindustrial societies, and it was most common to sleep early ("first sleep"), wake around midnight, and return to bed later ("second sleep"). Along with a nap in the day, it has been argued that this is the natural pattern of human sleep in long winter nights. A case has been made that maintaining such a sleep pattern may be important in regulating stress.

Historian A. Roger Ekirch has argued that before the Industrial Revolution, interrupted sleep was dominant in Western civilization. Ekirch asserts that the intervening period of wakefulness was used to pray and reflect, and to interpret dreams, which were more vivid at that hour than upon waking in the morning. This was also a favorite time for scholars and poets to write uninterrupted, whereas still others visited neighbors, engaged in sexual activity, or committed petty crime. This period of wakefulness was known as "the watch". Ekirch draws evidence from more than 500 references to a segmented sleeping pattern in documents from the ancient, medieval, and modern world. Other historians, such as Craig Koslofsky, have endorsed Ekirch's analysis.

Ekirch suggests that it is due to the modern use of electric lighting that most modern humans do not practice interrupted sleep. Some have proposed that a sleep pattern based on the historical biphasic sleep schedule might be beneficial, but there is no widespread agreement on this.

A 2015 study of three non-industrial equatorial societies showed that all three experienced monophasic nighttime sleep, but the authors' conclusions were questioned by Ekirch.

=== Single nap (siesta) ===
Another classic cultural example of a biphasic sleep pattern is the siesta, a nap taken in the early afternoon, often after eating lunch. Such a period of sleep is a common tradition in some countries, particularly those with a warm climate, where it allows people to avoid sunshine and heat during the hottest part of the day; many businesses in these countries open early in the morning (again to avoid the heat), close at 1 p.m. so employees can go home for a siesta, reopen at 3 p.m., and close at around 8 p.m. Historically common throughout the Mediterranean and Southern Europe, it is the traditional daytime sleep of China, Cyprus, Malta, Greece, India, Italy, Portugal, South Africa, Spain, and (through Spanish influence) the Philippines and Hispanic America. In modern times, fewer Spaniards take a daily siesta, ostensibly due to more demanding work schedules.

== Modern proposals ==
Everyman sleep pattern

Uberman sleep pattern

Dymaxion sleep pattern

The Everyman schedule involves sleeping 3 hours during the night ("core sleep"), and taking three 20-minute naps during the day. This totals 4 hours of sleep in a 24-hour period.

The Uberman sleep schedule consists of a 30-minute nap every four hours, totaling 3 hours of sleep in a 24-hour period. Other variations of this sleep pattern involve 8 naps throughout the day, or 20-minute sleep intervals as opposed to 30 minutes.

Buckminster Fuller described a regimen consisting of 30-minute naps every six hours. The short article about Fuller's nap schedule in Time in 1943, which referred to the schedule as "intermittent sleeping", says that he maintained it for two years, and notes that "he had to quit because his schedule conflicted with that of his business associates, who insisted on sleeping like other men." This schedule is likely the most extreme type of polyphasic sleep schedule, totaling only two hours of sleep in a 24-hour period.

== In extreme situations ==
In crises and other extreme conditions, people may not be able to achieve the recommended seven to nine hours of sleep per day. Systematic napping may be considered necessary in such situations.

Claudio Stampi, as a result of his interest in long-distance solo boat racing, has studied the systematic timing of short naps as a means of ensuring optimal performance in situations where extreme sleep deprivation is inevitable, but he does not advocate ultrashort napping as a lifestyle. Scientific American Frontiers (PBS) has reported on Stampi's 49-day experiment where a young man napped for a total of three hours per day. It purportedly shows that all stages of sleep were included. Stampi has written about his research in his book Why We Nap: Evolution, Chronobiology, and Functions of Polyphasic and Ultrashort Sleep (1992). In 1989 he published results of a field study in the journal Work & Stress, concluding that "polyphasic sleep strategies improve prolonged sustained performance" under continuous work situations. In addition, other long-distance solo sailors have documented their techniques for maximizing wake time on the open seas. One account documents the process by which a solo sailor broke his sleep into between six and seven naps per day. The naps would not be placed equiphasically, instead occurring more densely during night hours.

The U.S. military has studied fatigue countermeasures. An Air Force report states:

Each individual nap should be long enough to provide at least 45 continuous minutes of sleep, although longer naps (2 hours) are better. In general, the shorter each individual nap is, the more frequent the naps should be (the objective remains to acquire a daily total of 8 hours of sleep).

Similarly, the Canadian Marine pilots in their trainer's handbook report that:

Under extreme circumstances where sleep cannot be achieved continuously, research on napping shows that 10- to 20-minute naps at regular intervals during the day can help relieve some of the sleep deprivation and thus maintain ... performance for several days. However, researchers caution that levels of performance achieved using ultrashort sleep (short naps) to temporarily replace normal sleep are always well below that achieved when fully rested.

NASA, in cooperation with the National Space Biomedical Research Institute, has funded research on napping. Despite NASA recommendations that astronauts sleep eight hours a day when in space, they usually have trouble sleeping eight hours at a stretch, so the agency needs to know about the optimal length, timing and effect of naps. Professor David Dinges of the University of Pennsylvania School of Medicine led research in a laboratory setting on sleep schedules which combined various amounts of "anchor sleep", ranging from about four to eight hours in length, with no nap or daily naps of up to 2.5 hours. Longer naps were found to be better, with some cognitive functions benefiting more from napping than others. Vigilance and basic alertness benefited the least while working memory benefited greatly. Naps in the individual subjects' biological daytime worked well, but naps in their nighttime were followed by much greater sleep inertia lasting up to an hour.

The Italian Air Force (Aeronautica Militare Italiana) also conducted experiments for their pilots. In schedules involving night shifts and fragmentation of duty periods through the entire day, a sort of polyphasic sleeping schedule was studied. Subjects were to perform two hours of activity followed by four hours of rest (sleep allowed), this was repeated four times throughout the 24-hour day. Subjects adopted a schedule of sleeping only during the final three rest periods in linearly increasing duration. The AMI published findings that "total sleep time was substantially reduced as compared to the usual 7–8 hour monophasic nocturnal sleep" while "maintaining good levels of vigilance as shown by the virtual absence of EEG microsleeps." EEG microsleeps are measurable and usually unnoticeable bursts of sleep in the brain while a subject appears to be awake. Nocturnal sleepers who sleep poorly may be heavily bombarded with microsleeps during waking hours, limiting focus and attention.

== Physiology ==
The brain exhibits high levels of the pituitary hormone prolactin during the period of nighttime wakefulness, which may contribute to the feeling of peace that many people associate with it.

In his 1992 study "In short photoperiods, human sleep is biphasic", Thomas Wehr had seven healthy men confined to a room for fourteen hours of darkness daily for a month. At first the participants slept for about eleven hours, presumably making up for their sleep debt. After this the subjects began to sleep much as people in pre-industrial times were claimed to have done. They would sleep for about four hours, wake up for two to three hours, then go back to bed for another four hours. They also took about two hours to fall asleep.

Polyphasic sleep can be caused by irregular sleep–wake syndrome, a rare circadian rhythm sleep disorder which is usually caused by neurological abnormality, head injury or dementia. Much more common examples are the sleep of human infants and of many animals. Elderly humans often have disturbed sleep, including polyphasic sleep.

In their 2006 paper "The Nature of Spontaneous Sleep Across Adulthood", Campbell and Murphy studied sleep timing and quality in young, middle-aged, and older adults. They found that, in free-running conditions, the average duration of major nighttime sleep was significantly longer in young adults than in the other groups. The paper states further:

Whether such patterns are simply a response to the relatively static experimental conditions, or whether they more accurately reflect the natural organization of the human sleep/wake system, compared with that which is exhibited in daily life, is open to debate. However, the comparative literature strongly suggests that shorter, polyphasically-placed sleep is the rule, rather than the exception, across the entire animal kingdom (Campbell and Tobler, 1984; Tobler, 1989). There is little reason to believe that the human sleep/wake system would evolve in a fundamentally different manner. That people often do not exhibit such sleep organization in daily life merely suggests that humans have the capacity (often with the aid of stimulants such as caffeine or increased physical activity) to overcome the propensity for sleep when it is desirable, or is required, to do so.

== See also ==
- Watchkeeping
