= Ziporyn =

Ziporyn is a surname. Notable people with the surname include:

- Evan Ziporyn (born 1959), American composer and clarinetist
- Terra Ziporyn (born 1958), American writer
