= Susan Redline =

American pulmonary specialist

Academic background
- Education: MD, 1979, Boston University School of Medicine; MPH, 1984, Harvard T.H. Chan School of Public Health

Academic work
- Institutions: Harvard T.H. Chan School of Public Health; Case Western Reserve University School of Medicine

Susan Redline is an American pulmonary specialist. She is the Peter C. Farrell Professor of Sleep Medicine and Professor of Epidemiology at the Harvard T.H. Chan School of Public Health.

== Early life and education ==
Redline completed her medical degree in 1979 at Boston University School of Medicine and her Master's degree in public health in 1984 from the Harvard T.H. Chan School of Public Health.

== Career ==
=== Case Western ===
Upon completing her formal education, Redline joined the Case Western Reserve University School of Medicine, where she won the 2007 Mather Prize. In 2008, Redline and colleague John Baron were appointed co-directors of the University Hospital's Geneva Medical Center for Advanced Sleep Medicine.

During her tenure at Case Western, Redline sat on the board of directors of the American Academy of Sleep Medicine and chaired the Steering Committee for the Clinical and Translational Science Collaborative National Sleep Network. She also served as the deputy editor of the journal Sleep. On July 14, 2011, Redline was appointed the inaugural Peter C. Farrell Professorship of Sleep Medicine at Brigham and Women’s Hospital and Beth Israel Deaconess Medical Center.

=== Harvard University ===
On July 14, 2011, Redline was appointed the inaugural Peter C. Farrell Professorship of Sleep Medicine at Brigham and Women’s Hospital (BWH) and Beth Israel Deaconess Medical Center. In this role, she led a study testing whether sleep-disordered breathing (SDB) was the result of poor cognition or a predecessor and risk factor. The result of the study found that SDB was associated with and precedes a higher risk of cognitive impairment in older women. In recognition of her "outstanding scientific contributions in clinical and epidemiological research designed to understand the prevention and treatment of sleep disorders," Redline was awarded the American Thoracic Society’s 2012 Recognition Award for Scientific Accomplishments.

As director of BWH Division of Sleep and Cardiovascular Medicine, Redline was awarded the 2012 Clinical Innovations Grant Award for her proposed project Healthy Sleep/Healthy Hearts. The aim of the proposal was to "implement a comprehensive program to evaluate, diagnose and treat patients who suffer from common yet under-recognized sleep disorders and associated cardiovascular risks factors." While conducting her sleep research, Redline co-authored a study suggesting that African Americans were more likely to experience shorter sleep patterns than their white counterparts, which she described as the "black-white sleep gap." She followed this up with a three-year community outreach effort to learn about the obstacles African-Americans face towards getting a good sleep schedule and pattern.

In 2017, Redline received a National Heart, Lung, and Blood Institute R35 Outstanding Investigator Award for her program "Phenotypic and Molecular Signatures for Sleep Apnea." The aim of the program was to develop novel approaches for treating sleep apnea and preventing sleep apnea-related health complications. While developing the program, she also earned the 2017 William C. Dement Academic Achievement Award as a member of the sleep field who has displayed exceptional initiative and progress in the areas of sleep education and academic research. As a result of her history of leadership in cardiovascular and sleep research, Redline was appointed a member of the National Heart, Blood and Lung Institute’s Board of External Experts.

During the COVID-19 pandemic, Redline co-authored Sleep Apnea and COVID-19 Mortality and Hospitalization. She was later recognized as one of the world’s most influential researchers.
