= Charmane Eastman =

American academic research scientist in chronobiology

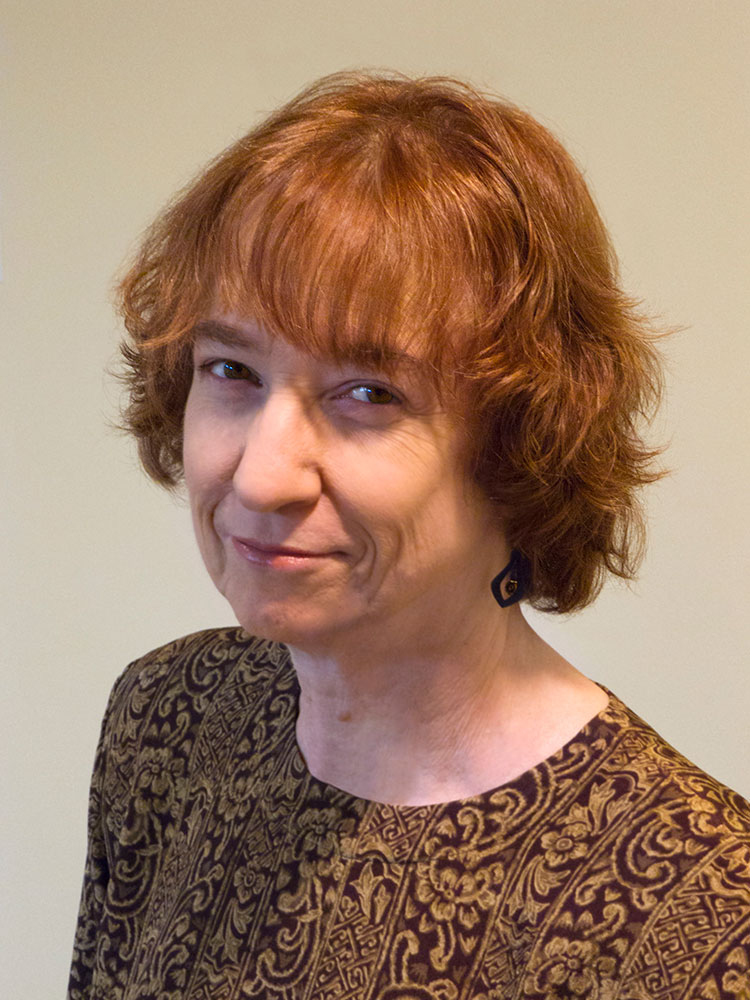
photo of Dr. Eastman in 2011

Charmane Eastman is an American academic research scientist whose career has focused on studying circadian rhythms and their relationships to sleep, jet lag, and shift work. She has also studied winter depression, more properly known as seasonal affective disorder (SAD). Of special focus are the effects of bright light and melatonin on circadian rhythms.

== Background and education ==
Eastman received a B.S. in mathematics with a minor in physics from SUNY Albany in 1965. Then she worked as a laboratory technician at MIT, Harvard and the University of California at Berkeley. Eventually, she attended graduate school at the University of Chicago where she earned an M.S. (1976) and Ph.D. (1980) in biological psychology. Her graduate school advisor was Allan Rechtschaffen, Her dissertation was titled "Circadian rhythms of temperature, waking, and activity in the rat: dissociations, desynchronizations, and disintegrations." She then completed a post-doctoral position in the Department of Psychiatry in 1983, also in Rechtscaffen's Sleep Lab at the University of Chicago.

== Career ==
In 1983, Rosalind Cartwright offered Eastman a faculty position in the Psychology Department at Rush University Medical Center (RUMC), Chicago, where, in 1987, she founded and became Director of the Biological Rhythms Research Laboratory. She is currently Professor Emeritus in the Department of Psychiatry and Behavioral Sciences at RUMC.

== Summary of selected contributions ==
- Spontaneous internal desynchronization. Eastman's Ph.D. dissertation included a one oscillator computer model of human circadian rhythms that explained spontaneous internal desynchronization. This model challenged the accepted theory that human circadian rhythms are controlled by two oscillators, one for physiological rhythms like body temperature and one for sleep and wake. Her one oscillator model paved the way for the current established model showing sleep controlled by a single circadian oscillator and a homeostatic component for sleep need.
- Seasonal affective disorder (SAD or winter depression). Eastman developed a novel placebo treatment that she used to demonstrate the efficacy of bright light therapy for this condition.
- NASA shuttle missions. Eastman was commissioned by NASA to create light/dark schedules for space shuttle astronauts to follow before their missions. The purpose of the schedules was to gradually shift the astronauts' internal circadian clocks until they aligned with the shift work sleep schedules required while on orbit.
- Light History. Eastman's lab demonstrated that the amount of bright light that people were exposed to in the days before a procedure could affect their sensitivity to the bright lights used in laboratory experiments and treatments.
- Dark length. Her laboratory demonstrated the dramatic effect that sleep length (dark length) has on the magnitude of circadian rhythm phase shifts that can be produced by bright light.
- Phase Response Curves (PRCs). Eastman devised an efficient (fewer days and less expensive) method for generating PRCs in humans. PRCs are used to determine when to apply a stimulus such as bright light exposure or melatonin to phase shift circadian rhythms, to determine when the stimulus will make circadian rhythms earlier (phase advance) or later (phase delay).
- Melatonin and bright light. Eastman's laboratory has conducted numerous studies using bright light or melatonin or the two combined to phase-shift human subjects in the laboratory. They generated phase response curves to two popular doses of melatonin which showed that for making circadian rhythms earlier (phase advances) melatonin was most effective when taken 5–7 hours before bedtime, rather than just before bedtime when most people take it. For making circadian rhythms later (phase delays), melatonin should be taken upon waking.
- Jet lag. Eastman's lab demonstrated how to start shifting circadian rhythms before flights (using bright light, sunglasses, sleep schedules and melatonin) to reduce or eliminate jet lag.
- Shift work. Eastman has designed sleep and light schedules that reduce the circadian misalignment that is the basis of many of the physical and psychological harms caused by shift work.
- Blue Light. After the discovery of the new mammalian photoreceptors in the retina (distinct from rods and cones) called intrinsically photosensitive retinal ganglion cells (ipRCGs), that are most sensitive to blue light, there was much excitement in the field. Eastman's lab generated the first phase response curve to blue light. They also compared blue-enriched white light boxes with the traditional white fluorescent light boxes and found that the traditional light boxes were already emitting enough blue light for maximal results.
- Racial differences in human circadian rhythms. Eastman discovered that African-Americans have shorter free-running circadian periods than European-Americans, which is an advantage in our early bird dominated society. This finding also has real-world implications with regards to shift work, jet lag, and delayed sleep phase syndrome.

== Most cited publications ==
- Baehr EK, Revelle W, Eastman CI. Individual differences in the phase and amplitude of the human circadian temperature rhythm: with an emphasis on morningness–eveningness. Journal of Sleep Research. 2000 Jun;9(2):117-27 (open access) (Cited 690 times, according to Google Scholar.)
- Eastman CI, Young MA, Fogg LF, Liu L, Meaden PM. Bright light treatment of winter depression: a placebo-controlled trial. Archives of General Psychiatry. 1998 Oct 1;55(10):883-9. (open access) (Cited 518 times, according to Google Scholar.)
- Hébert M, Martin SK, Lee C, Eastman CI. The effects of prior light history on the suppression of melatonin by light in humans. Journal of Pineal Research. 2002 Nov;33(4):198-203 (open access) (Cited 475 times, according to Google Scholar.)
- Burgess HJ, Sharkey KM, Eastman CI. Bright light, dark and melatonin can promote circadian adaptation in night shift workers. Sleep Medicine Reviews. 2002 Oct 1;6(5):407-20. (Cited 315 times, according to Google Scholar.)
- Crowley SJ, Lee C, Tseng CY, Fogg LF, Eastman CI. Combinations of bright light, scheduled dark, sunglasses, and melatonin to facilitate circadian entrainment to night shift work. Journal of Biological Rhythms. 2003 Dec;18(6):513-23. (open access) (Cited 272 times, according to Google Scholar.)

== Awards ==
- In 2012, she received the Excellence in Applied Circadian Rhythm Research Award from the National Sleep Foundation.
