= Thomas Roth (scientist) =

American sleep researcher (born 1942)

- Scientific career
- Fields: Sleep studies
- Workplaces: University of Cincinnati
- Thesis: Extradimensional and Intradimensional Shifts in Multi-Dimensional Multi-Attributed Tasks
- Doctoral advisor: Donald Schumsky

Thomas Roth (born 1942) is an American scientist who researches sleep and sleep disorders. The founder of the Sleep Disorders and Research Center at Henry Ford Health, Roth is also Professor Emeritus of Wayne State University School of Medicine, and a Clinical Professor Emeritus of the University of Michigan College of Medicine.

== Early life and education ==
Roth earned a B.A. at Hunter College in 1965, an M.A. at the University of Cincinnati 1969, and a Ph.D. at the University of Cincinnati in 1971. Roth married Karen Lee Harris in 1966, and they had two sons, Daniel and Adam, before divorcing in 1978. He subsequently married Toni Grissom in 1981 and they had two children, Jonathan and Andrea.

== Career ==
Roth explained his early interest in sleep research as a result of a summer job:

"When I was a student there was a job opening in a dream laboratory in the department of psychiatry. I figured I could do anything for a summer, so I worked in the laboratory and became enthralled with learning about sleep. It occurred to me that we just did not know much about a third of our lives—the time we spend sleeping... even the most rudimentary description of sleep in science didn't exist yet. The average person spends 25 years of their life sleeping and we knew nothing about that. That summer job totally changed the way I worked, and sleep became my interest for life."

In 1978 Roth founded the Sleep Disorders and Research Center at Henry Ford Health. In 2014, after his retirement, he was honored at a reception of the SLEEP 2014 conference in Minneapolis.

Over his career, Roth has served in many leadership positions:

- President of the Sleep Research Society
- Founding President of the National Sleep Foundation
- Chairman, National Center on Sleep Disorders Research Advisory Board of the National Institutes of Health
- Board of Directors of the Associated Professional Sleep Societies
- Co-chair, World Health Organization's worldwide project on sleep and health

== Selected publications ==
=== Books ===
- Kryger, Meir H.; Roth, Thomas; Dement, William C. (2010-11-01). Principles and Practice of Sleep Medicine E-Book: Expert Consult - Online and Print. Elsevier Health Sciences. ISBN 978-1-4377-2773-9.

=== Articles ===
- Roehrs, Timothy; Hyde, Maren; Blaisdell, Brandi; Greenwald, Mark; Roth, Thomas (2006-02-01). "Sleep Loss and REM Sleep Loss are Hyperalgesic". Sleep. 29 (2): 145–151. doi:10.1093/sleep/29.2.145. ISSN 0161-8105. PMID 16494081.
- Breslau, Naomi; Roth, Thomas; Rosenthal, Leon; Andreski, Patricia (1996-03-15). "Sleep disturbance and psychiatric disorders: A longitudinal epidemiological study of young Adults". Biological Psychiatry. 39 (6): 411–418. doi:10.1016/0006-3223(95)00188-3. ISSN 0006-3223. PMID 8679786.
- He, Jiang; Kryger, Meir H.; Zorick, Frank J.; Conway, William; Roth, Thomas (1988-07-01). "Mortality and Apnea Index in Obstructive Sleep Apnea: Experience in 385 Male Patients". Chest. 94 (1): 9–14. doi:10.1378/chest.94.1.9. ISSN 0012-3692. PMID 3289839.
- Fujita, Shiro; Conway, William; Zorick, Frank; Roth, Thomas (November 1981). "Surgical Correction of Anatomic Abnormalities in Obstructive Sleep Apnea Syndrome: Uvulopalatopharyngoplasty". Otolaryngology–Head and Neck Surgery. 89 (6): 923–934. doi:10.1177/019459988108900609. ISSN 0194-5998. PMID 6801592.
- Ancoli-Israel, S; Roth, T (1999-05-01). "Characteristics of insomnia in the United States: results of the 1991 National Sleep Foundation Survey. I". Sleep. 22 Suppl 2: S347–53. ISSN 1550-9109. PMID 10394606.
- Drake, Christopher L.; Roehrs, Timothy; Richardson, Gary; Walsh, James K.; Roth, Thomas (December 2004). "Shift Work Sleep Disorder: Prevalence and Consequences Beyond that of Symptomatic Day Workers". Sleep. 27 (8): 1453–1462. doi:10.1093/sleep/27.8.1453. PMID 15683134.

== Awards, honors ==
- 2014 Lifetime Achievement Award, National Sleep Foundation
- 2012 SRS Mary Carskadon Outstanding Educator Award
- 1999 Worldwide Service Award from the World Federation of Sleep Research Societies
- 1998 Distinguished Scientist Award, Sleep Research Society
- 1990 Nathaniel Kleitman Distinguished Service Award, American Academy of Sleep Medicine

== See also ==
- Insomnia
- Middle-of-the-night insomnia
- REM rebound
