= David F. Dinges =

American sleep researcher

- Education: Saint Louis University
- Scientific career
- Workplaces: University of Pennsylvania School of Medicine

David F. Dinges is an American sleep researcher and teacher.

He is professor of psychology in psychiatry, chief of the Division of Sleep and Chronobiology in the Department of Psychiatry, and associate director of the Center for Sleep and Respiratory Neurobiology in the University of Pennsylvania School of Medicine. Dinges earned his M.S. (1974) and Ph.D. (1976) degrees in experimental physiological psychology from Saint Louis University.

Dinges has served as president of the Sleep Research Society, on the boards of directors of the American Academy of Sleep Medicine and the National Sleep Foundation, as president of the World Federation of Sleep Research and Sleep Medicine Societies and as editor-in-chief of SLEEP, the leading scientific journal on sleep research and sleep medicine.

== Life, research and work ==
His laboratory studies the physiological, cognitive and functional changes resulting from sleep loss in humans. His research has primarily focused on the manner in which sleep homeostasis and circadian rhythmicity control cognitive, affective, behavioral, endocrine and immunological processes. Dinges' work has contributed to our knowledge of the effects of sleep disorders, the recovery potential of naps, the nature of sleep inertia and the impact of cumulative sleep debt. He has developed technologies for monitoring human neurobehavioral capability, such as his patented Psychomotor Vigilance Test (PVT).

He has consulted with many U.S. agencies, including the Department of Transportation, National Institutes of Health, NASA and the military as well as several non-federal, private and foreign entities on the physiological and behavioral effects of sleep deprivation, and ways to mitigate these effects.

Dinges' CV in November 2007 showed 130 peer-reviewed research publications dated 1972 to 2007 as well as more than 90 editorials, reviews, chapters and committee reports, 1978 to 2007. Together with R. J. Broughton, he edited Sleep and Alertness: Chronobiological, Behavioral and Medical Aspects of Napping, Raven Press, New York, 1989. Together with M. P. Szuba and J. D. Kloss, he edited Insomnia: Principles and Management, Cambridge University Press, New York, 2003. Together with his colleague Siobhan Banks he co-wrote the chapter on sleep deprivation in Principles and Practice of Sleep Medicine.

He has been featured talking on several documentaries discussing sleep, including two 60 minutes documentaries on sleep and a National Geographic documentary called Sleepless in America.

Videos of his short Science Network lectures Behaving without sleep: Biological limits on our environmental demands and Napping and Recovery at the Salk Institute, 09 and 10 February 2007, can be viewed online.
