= Charles Czeisler =

American physician and sleep researcher

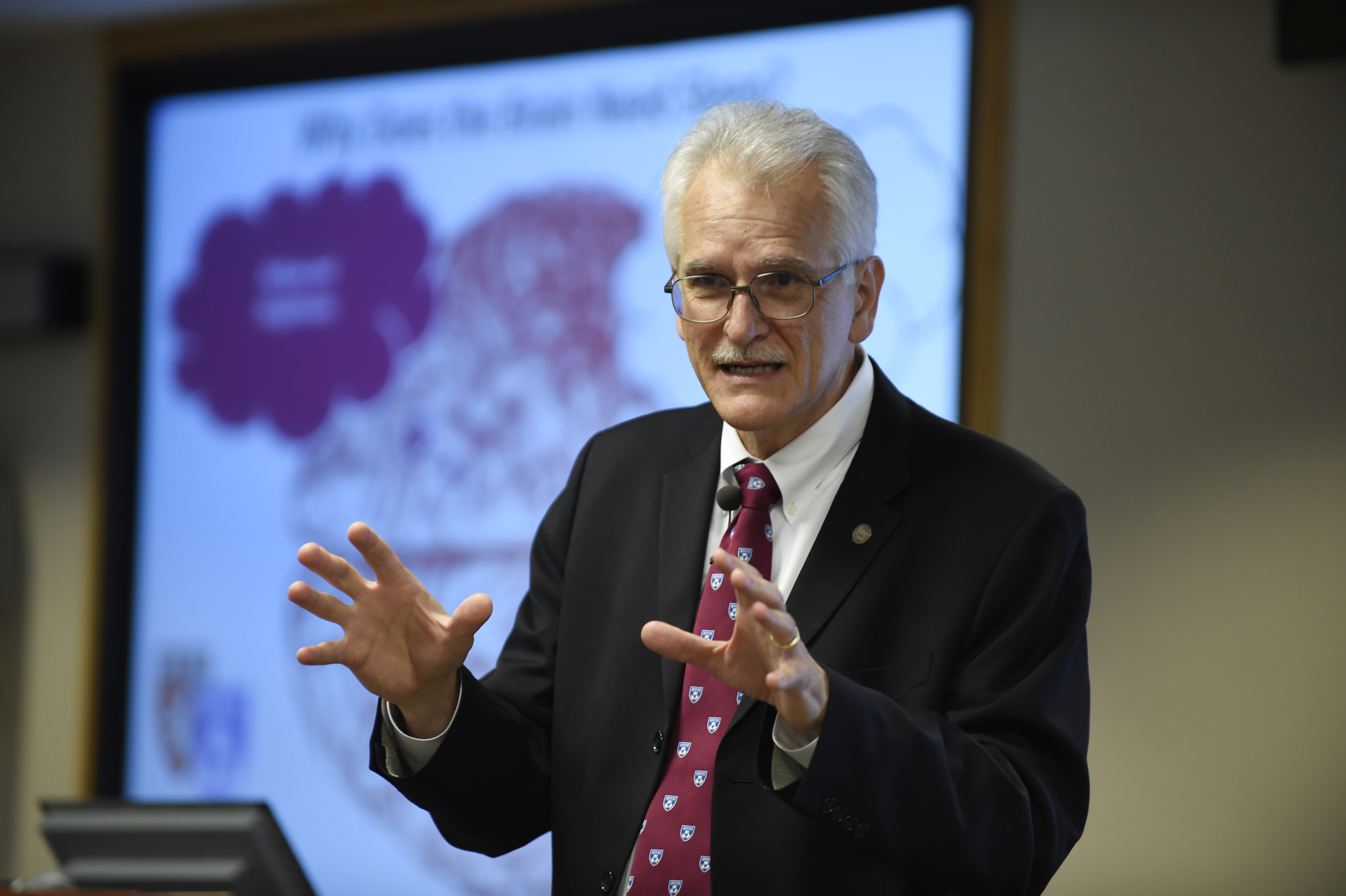
- Known for: Human sleep medicine Circadian rhythm research
- Awards: Aschoff's Rule National Sleep Foundation: Lifetime Achievement Award; Royal College of London: Adrian Gold Medal; Stanford Medicine Alumni Association: J.E. Wallace Sterling Lifetime Achievement Award in Medicine Harvard Medical School Division of Sleep Medicine: Peter C. Farrell Prize in Sleep Medicine
- Scientific career
- Academic advisors: William C. Dement; Elliot D. Weitzman
- Website: Harvard Neuroscience faculty page Harvard Medical School faculty profile

Charles Andrew Czeisler (born November 1952) is a Hungarian-American physician and sleep and circadian researcher. He is a leading researcher and author in the fields of the effects of light on human physiology, circadian rhythms and sleep medicine.

== Background and education ==
Czeisler graduated from Harvard College, magna cum laude in 1974, with a degree in biochemistry and molecular biology. His undergraduate thesis was focused on cortisol timing release. He then studied at Stanford University, where he received his Ph.D. in neuro- and bio-behavioral sciences in 1978 and his M.D. in 1981. As a graduate student at Stanford, Czeisler continued his research in Dr. William Dement's lab. Dr. Elliot Weitzman, who both worked with and mentored Czeisler, influenced Czeisler to study sleep. Today, Czeisler is the Baldino Professor of Sleep Medicine and Director of the Division of Sleep Medicine at Harvard Medical School. Additionally, he works as the Division Chief of Sleep Medicine at Brigham and Women's Hospital in Boston, Massachusetts.

Czeisler has spent over 40 years researching the relationship between light and human physiology, particularly, the physiology of the human circadian clock. He teaches a course at Harvard College on Circadian Biology for undergraduate and graduate students. He was ultimately inducted into the Phi Beta Kappa honor society at Harvard College in 1999. In addition to his work at Harvard Medical School and Brigham and Women's Hospital, Czeisler is a Diplomate of the American Board of Sleep Medicine, an elected member of the National Academy of Medicine, the International Academy of Astronautics and the American Clinical and Climatological Association, and a Fellow of the Royal College of Physicians, American Society for Clinical Investigation, and Association of American Physicians.

=== Family life ===
Czeisler was one of Tibor Czeisler and Wanda Victoria Murzyn's three children. In 1993, Czeisler married Theresa Lynn Shanahan M.D. They now have three children and live in the Boston area. In his free time, Czeisler enjoys swimming, playing pickleball, and slalom waterskiing.

== Research interests ==
Czeisler's research focus is the neurobiology of human circadian rhythm, the functions and physiology of sleep, the epidemiology and public health consequences of sleep disorders, and the applications of circadian and sleep principles in clinical medicine and occupational safety and health. He also examines the relationship between the circadian oscillator and sleep homeostasis, including a landmark 1980 Science paper demonstrating that sleep episodes were correlated with the circadian phase of the body temperature rhythm at bedtime and not with the length of prior wakefulness. Czeisler's research interests encompass many areas, including the effects of light on human circadian rhythms, the role of sleep and circadian rhythms in metabolism, the impact of shift work on health and productivity, and the effects of melatonin and melatonin receptor agonists on humans.

Czeisler investigates how the physiological system works to reset the human central circadian pacemaker, located in the hypothalamus and called the suprachiasmatic nucleus (SCN). Among his most salient contributions to this research area are a pair of seminal Science original research articles published in 1986 and 1989. The first, entitled "Bright light resets the human circadian pacemaker independent of the timing of the sleep-wake cycle," provided convincing evidence that light influences the human circadian pacemaker, contributing to control of daily variations in physiologic, behavioral, and cognitive function. This finding challenged the then-common idea that synchronization to the 24-hour day accomplished either through social contacts or the sleep-wake schedule. This scientific breakthrough was featured on the front page of The New York Times in June 1989.

Czeisler then led the discovery that light transduced by non-visual input (melanopsin activation) could reset the circadian clock in patients without sight. This indicated that some blind humans can entrain to light through non-visual photoreceptors. Czeisler found that intrinsically photosensitive retinal ganglion cells (ipRGCs) influence both the circadian clock and visual perception, indicating that ipRGCs contribute to "visual" light perception even in the absence of rod and cone photoreceptors. Significantly, this challenged the misconception that rod and cone photoreceptors were the sole receptors for photo-entrainment in humans. In 2002, Czeisler published a study that defended the long-held notion that mammals do not have extra-occular photoreceptors. The findings of his study definitively refuted those of the famous 1998 Science publication, "Extraocular Circadian Phototransduction in Humans," which had reported that bright light behind the knees can help regulated human circadian photoentrainment. Czeisler's study debunked the 1998 publication.

Czeisler has examined the effects of sleep deprivation on the sleep-wake cycle and circadian rhythms, and how this impacts attention performance. He found that bright light duration impacts the circadian pacemaker, melatonin suppression, and sleepiness. He has also discovered that even room lighting can suppress melatonin production and its duration. Czeisler has also dedicated a portion of his career to examining the effects of light timing, duration, intensity, and wavelength on resetting the pacemaker through ipRGCs, which contain the photopigment melanopsin.

Czeisler's work has many important applications. He showed that sleep deprivation could have adverse consequences affecting obesity and diabetes, among other health problems. He has also investigated the effects of chronic sleep deprivation and restriction, night shifts, and circadian disruption, on neurobehavioral performance and metabolism. Furthermore, Czeisler studied how sleep deprivation impairs the psychomotor performance of night shift workers (2009-2014), specifically surgeons (2009-2013) and residents (2010), police officers (2004-2008), and truck drivers (2012). Other research interests of his include studying wakefulness, sleep deprivation and how it can be prevented, and such influences on the clock as exercise and age. Czeisler's research has been applied to medicine, space travel, and night occupations including shift-work.

As of August 2023, Czeisler has published more than 300 scientific articles, which have accumulated more than 80,000 citations, leading to an h-index of 138.

=== Summary of selected contributions ===
- 1980 – Demonstrated that human sleep duration and organization depend on its circadian phase.
- 1981 – Characterized and named Delayed Sleep Phase Syndrome (aka Delayed Sleep-Wake Phase Disorder)
- 1986 – Discovered that light resets the human circadian pacemaker, not social cues or sleep-wake cycles as previously thought.
- 1989 – Characterized the profound sensitivity of the human circadian clock to light.
- 1995 – Discovered that blind people can still retain sleep rhythms if their eyes remain intact.
- 1996 – Characterization of the dose-response relationship between light and circadian phase
- 1999 – Determined that the average intrinsic circadian period in humans is 24.18 hours, not over 25 hours as previously thought.
- 2002 – Invalidated reported findings of a study claiming bright light behind the knees impacted human circadian rhythms.
- 2004 and 2005 – Demonstrated the risks of extended-duration shifts by medical residents, and health and performance benefits of reduced work hours.
- 2006 – Published on the benefit of modafinil for excessive sleepiness in people with shift work disorder.
- 2011 – Discovered that women have, on average, shorter intrinsic circadian periods than men
- 2012 – Demonstrated that prolonged sleep restriction with concurrent circadian disruption impairs glucose regulation and metabolism
- 2015 – Revealed that evening use of light-emitting devices negatively affects sleep, circadian timing, and next-morning alertness

== Advocacy in sleep health and occupational safety ==
In a 1999 interview with the Harvard Gazette regarding his team's characterization of a near-24-hour human circadian period, Czeisler noted that "accepting the near-24-hour period means that all the ideas about daily human rhythms that we take for granted must be rethought." Understanding the internal circadian period makes problems dealing with jet-lag, night shifts, and sleep schedules in orbit more approachable

Guided by the significant real-life implications of his research, Czeisler is a strong advocate for healthy sleep habits. In consulting with the Boston Celtics, Portland Trail Blazers, and Minnesota Timberwolves for the National Basketball Association (NBA) and Cleveland Browns for the National Football League (NFL), he emphasized sleep as the "third pillar of health" alongside nutrition and exercise. He instituted structural changes to the teams' schedules to allow for healthier sleep habits, including pushing morning practices into the afternoon and the '2 a.m. rule' which prevents players from traveling if they are going to arrive at their hotel later than 2:00 am.

According to Czeisler, sleep deficiency poses a significant individual and public health hazard as demonstrated by the significant contribution of drowsiness to workplace accidents and motor vehicle accidents. In an interview with the Harvard Business Review, he explains that companies should seek to address this problem by setting behavioral expectations and scheduling policies for employees to avoid accruing sleep deficit.

In order to implement improved occupational sleep scheduling and sleep health standards as effective public policy, Czeisler has served on and consulted to numerous national and international health advisory agencies. As President of the National Sleep Foundation from 2005–2006, he chaired the Presidential Task Force on Sleep and Public Policy in order to develop model legislation regarding physician-in-training work hours. As a Team Leader of the Human Performance Factors, Sleep and Chronobiology Team at the NASA National Space Biomedical Research Institute, Czeisler has been responsible for developing sleep-wake schedule guidelines for NASA astronauts and mission control personnel.

Czeisler is also a member of the Brigham Health Sleep Matters Initiative,(SMI) which was created "to implement evidence-based clinical treatments for sleep and circadian disorders, and to change the culture of sleep." In 2018, the National Safety Council recognized the SMI for its outstanding commitment to safety, for which it was awarded the prestigious Green Cross for Safety Award.

In 2018, Czeisler penned a powerful Perspective in The New England Journal of Medicine entitled "Housing Immigrant Children - The Inhumanity of Constant Illumination" in which he harshly criticized the constant light exposure to which children were being subjected in detention centers while awaiting immigration processing, as this did not allow for exposure to light-dark cycles central to circadian regulation.

In 2023, together with Harvard Medical School Professor Elizabeth Klerman, Czeisler organized a seminar at the Harvard Radcliffe Institute to discuss whether daylight saving time should be eliminated or made permanent—a debate they call "another clash between scientific evidence and politics." The seminar brought together researchers, policymakers, and members of the general public for a discussion.

A more complete listing of agencies to which Czeisler has consulted can be found at his Harvard Faculty Profile.

== Honors and awards ==
Czeisler's research in sleep medicine, circadian rhythms, and professional advocacy for occupational health and safety, are the subject of various honors and awards included below:

- National top 40 Winner, Westinghouse Science Talent Search (1970): Awarded by the Society for Science to high school seniors, the nation's oldest and most prestigious science competition.
- Aschoff's Rule International Award in Circadian Biology (2001): Awarded by the Society for Research on Biological Rhythms for his contributions to the field of Chronobiology in 2001
- The NIOSH Director's Award for Scientific Leadership in Occupational Safety And Health (2005): Awarded by the National Institute for Occupational Safety and Health for research on the impact of long working hours on serious medical error by interns and strategies to reduce the rate of such errors.
- The William C. Dement Academic Achievement Award (2002): Awarded by the American Academy of Sleep Medicine for having displayed exceptional initiative and progress in the areas of sleep education and academic research.
- The Lifetime Achievement Award (2008): Awarded by the National Sleep Foundation for outstanding contributions, professional productivity and leadership in the field of sleep medicine.
- The Adrian Gold Medal (2008): Awarded by the Royal Society of Medicine to medical practitioners whose contributions to the practice of sleep medicine have been a significant advancement in the field.
- The Distinguished Scientist Award (2008): Awarded by the Sleep Research Society for significant, sustained career scientific advances in the field of sleep research. Czeisler is Past President of the Sleep Research Society
- The Mark O. Hatfield Public Policy Award (2010): Awarded by the American Academy of Sleep Medicine for leading advocacy in the development of sleep-related public policy that promotes safety and occupational health.
- The Mary A. Carskadon Outstanding Educator Award and Distinguished Scientist Award (2011): Awarded by the Sleep Research Society for contributions to training sleep and circadian professionals and/or educating the general public.
- The NASA Johnson Space Center Director's Innovation Award (2014): Awarded by NASA for initiative and innovation in establishing a new circadian rhythm countermeasure, the flexible Space Station Lighting Assembly for the International Space Station.
- The Green Cross for Safety Innovation Award Winner (2018): Awarded by the National Safety Council to the Brigham Health Sleep Matters Initiative team for having approached a long-held challenge and, using a fresh perspective or new idea, developed a transformative response to the problem.
- The Peter C. Farrell Prize in Sleep Medicine (2019): Awarded by the Harvard Medical School Division of Sleep Medicine in celebration of his life and work, specifically for his landmark discoveries in the field of human circadian rhythms, tireless advocacy for initiatives to improve sleep and circadian health, and establishment of sleep research training programs at Harvard and nationally.
- The J.E. Wallace Sterling Lifetime Achievement Award in Medicine (2019): Awarded by the Stanford Medicine Alumni Association in recognition of exceptional lifetime achievement in medicine. A video tribute to his career was made and shown at the award ceremony.

Czeisler is a co-inventor of several U.S. patents:

- 5,146,927: Test for evaluation of visual functioning in visually impaired subjects (1992)
- 5,167,228: Assessment and modification of endogenous circadian phase and amplitude (1992)
- 5,176,133: Assessment and modification of circadian phase and amplitude (1993)
- 5,503,637: Apparatus for producing and delivering high-intensity light to a subject (1996)
- 5,545,192: Intermittent use of bright light to modify the circadian phase (1996)
- 8,852,127: System and method for monitoring information related to sleep (2014)

During October 2019, a Festschrift was organized to celebrate Czeisler's career. The event was held in the Harvard Biological Laboratories, where Czeiser's colleagues, former pupils, friends, and family gathered to present plenary speeches and breakthrough scientific talks. The occasion brought together approximately 75 researchers from six different continents.

A more complete list of honors and awards bestowed upon Czeisler can be found on his Harvard Faculty Profile
