= Why We Nap =

1992 book edited by Claudio Stampi

Why We Nap: Evolution, Chronobiology, and Functions of Polyphasic and Ultrashort Sleep
- Language: English
- Genre: Science book
- Publisher: Birkhäuser, Boston
- Publication date: August 1, 1990
- Pages: 280
- ISBN: 0-8176-3462-2 (hardcover)

Why We Nap: Evolution, Chronobiology, and Functions of Polyphasic and Ultrashort Sleep is a 1992 book edited by Claudio Stampi, sole proprietor of the Chronobiology Research Institute. It is frequently mentioned by "polyphasic sleepers", as it is one of the few published books about the subject of systematic short napping in extreme situations where consolidated sleep is not possible.

According to the book, in a sleep deprived condition, measurements of a polyphasic sleeper's memory retention and analytical ability show increases as compared with monophasic and biphasic sleep (but still a decrease of 12% as compared with free running sleep). According to Stampi, the improvement is due to an extraordinary evolutionary predisposition to adopt such a sleep schedule; he hypothesizes this is possibly because polyphasic sleep was the preferred schedule of ancestors of the human race for thousands of years prior to the adoption of the monophasic schedule.

According to EEG measurements collected by Dr. Stampi during a 50-day trial of polyphasic ultrashort sleep with a test subject and published in his book Why We Nap, the proportion of sleep stages remains roughly the same during both polyphasic and monophasic sleep schedules. The major differences are that the ratio of lighter sleep stages to deeper sleep stages is slightly reduced and that sleep stages are often taken out of order or not at all, that is, some naps may be composed primarily of slow wave sleep while rapid eye movement sleep dominates other naps.
