= SleepBot =

Alarm clock and sleep tracking application

- SleepBot Logo
- Developer: SleepBot LLC
- Final release: Android; 3.2.8 (16 December 2013; 12 years ago) iOS; 1.3 (11 April 2016; 10 years ago)
- Operating system: Android, iOS
- Available in: Multilingual
- License: Freeware
- Website: mysleepbot.com

SleepBot was an alarm clock and sleep tracking application available for mobile devices and web. The mobile version worked with Android and iOS smartphones and tablets, while the web version ran through a device's web browser.

Jane Zhu, a member of the development team, wrote that SleepBot development had ceased. The last update, SleepBot 1.3 for iOS, was released in April 2016 to improve iOS 9.3 compatibility.

== Features ==
SleepBot included two main features: "sleep debt estimation" and "smart alarms."

- SleepBot's "sleep debt estimation" claimed to estimate how much sleep debt the user has incurred.
- SleepBot's "smart alarm" feature used the device's accelerometer to detect whether the user was in non-REM sleep and attempt to wake them up.

== See also ==
- Quantified Self § Activity monitors
- Quantified Self#Sleep-specific monitors
