= Thomas Roth =

Thomas Roth may refer to:

- Thomas Roth (athlete) (born 1991), Norwegian middle-distance runner
- Thomas Roth (journalist) (born 1951), German news anchor presenter
- Thomas Roth (scientist) (born 1942), American scientist who researches sleep and sleep disorders.
- Thomas Roth (born 1951), Brazilian singer, composer and TV presenter on Sistema Brasileiro de Televisão
