= Thomas Wehr =

American psychiatrist

- Education: University of Louisville School of Medicine , Yale School of Medicine
- Known for: Seasonal affective disorder, Major depressive disorder
- Awards: Anna-Monika Prize
- Scientific career
- Fields: Psychiatrist
- Workplaces: National Institute of Mental Health

Thomas Alvin Wehr is an American psychiatrist, research scientist, and author. He is a scientist emeritus and former chief of the Clinical Psychobiology branch of the National Institute of Mental Health (NIMH).

== Education ==
Wehr received his degree in medicine from the University of Louisville School of Medicine in 1969. He subsequently completed his psychiatric residency at Yale School of Medicine and an internship at Michael Reese Hospital.

== Research ==
In a 1990s study on photoperiodicity in humans, Wehr placed a group of volunteers in an environment in which it was dark for 14 hours each day for a month. The subjects were able to sleep as much as they wanted during the experiment. On the first night, the subjects slept an average of 11 hours a night. This was concluded to be probably repaying a chronic sleep debt. By the fourth week, the subjects slept an average of eight hours a night – but in two separate blocks. First, subjects tended to lie awake for one to two hours and then fall quickly asleep. The onset of sleep was linked to a spike in the hormone melatonin, whose secretion by the brain's pineal gland is triggered by darkness. After an average of three to five hours of sleep, the subjects would awaken and spend an hour or two in quiet wakefulness before a second three- to five-hour sleep period. It was thus suggested that such a biphasic pattern of sleep is the natural or pre-historic tendency for humans. No research into the sleeping patterns in natural environments of primates closely related to humans was cited for comparison.

Wehr and colleague Norman E. Rosenthal are credited with identifying and describing Seasonal Affective Disorder (SAD) and developing light therapy to treat it.

Wehr and colleague Anna Wirz-Justice were awarded the Anna Monika Prize for their work in the chronobiology of depressive illness. They carried out the first sleep phase advance experiment in a bipolar patient.

Wehr was the co-author of Circadian Rhythms in Psychiatry (Psychobiology and Psychopathology) with Frederick Goodwin, and How to Beat Jet Lag (1993) with D.A. Oren, W. Reich, and N. Rosenthal.

== See also ==
- Segmented sleep
