= Ronald Szymusiak =

American neurobiologist and editor of SLEEP

Ronald Szymusiak is a somnologist and professor of medicine and neurobiology at the David Geffen School of Medicine at UCLA. He was the editor-in-chief of SLEEP sleep medicine journal from 2015 to 2021.

In 2017, 2018, 2021, 2022, and 2023, Szymusiak received a Veterans Affairs Research Career Scientist Award.

He earnt a Ph.D. in biological psychology from the University of Illinois in 1982. He studied neurobiology at UCLA after graduating.
