= Dinges =

Dinges is a surname. Notable people with the surname include:

- David F. Dinges, American sleep researcher and teacher
- Erich Dinges (1911–1953), SS-Sturmmann
- John Dinges (born 1941), American reporter and author
- Vance Dinges (1915–1990), American baseball player
