= Elizabeth Klerman =

Professor of neurology

Elizabeth Klerman is a professor of neurology at Harvard Medical School. Her research focuses on applying circadian and sleep research principles to human physiology and pathophysiology. She also uses mathematical analysis and modeling to study human circadian, sleep, and objective neurobehavioral performance and subjective (self-reported) mood and alertness rhythms.

== Background and education ==
Klerman received her B.S. from Massachusetts Institute of Technology (MIT). She then received her M.D. in 1990 from Harvard University, along with a PhD in Physiology. She did her internship in internal medicine at Newton-Wellesley Hospital in Newton, MA from 1992-1993. Klerman is currently a Professor of Neurology at Massachusetts General Hospital and Harvard Medical School. She served as a team lead for the National Space Biomedical Research Institution (NSBRI), which is affiliated with NASA. She is also currently a member of the International Academy of Astronautics and serves as Director of the Analytic and Modeling Unit (AMU) within the Division of Sleep and Circadian Disorders at Brigham and Women's Hospital.

== Research contributions ==
=== Sleep and circadian rhythms in the blind ===
As a physician-scientist, Klerman was interested in how clinical medicine and circadian rhythms interact. After receiving her M.D. and Ph.D., Klerman conducted studies with people who are totally blind, looking to test hypothesis that individuals who are completely visually blind may still have light input to the circadian system. The experiments included measure the effect of bright light exposure via the eyes on plasma melatonin levels in blind patients. In 1995, Charles Czeisler, Klerman, and other colleagues published a paper in The New England Journal of Medicine illustrating that light exposure to some blind patients can suppress melatonin secretion. This provided evidence that light stimuli are processed through the eye for visual (e.g., seeing text or a person) and non-visual (e.g., melatonin suppression) functions.

Klerman continued her research on non-photic effects (not light-related) that alter circadian rhythms. Klerman conducted laboratory experiments on additional blind individuals meeting research study requirements–one being "no conscious light perception"–in conjunction with Czeisler. When conducting this study, it was well known that light was the central stimulus allowing human circadian clocks to entrain to 24-hour light/dark cycles, but the idea that non-photic entrainment could occur was not yet discovered. The paper, titled "Nonphotic entrainment of the human circadian pacemaker," illustrated that the human circadian pacemaker can entrain to 24 hour light-dark cycles via alternate pathways not involving light. Her work has also provided insights into how light exposure can be manipulated to optimize sleep and circadian function, particularly in settings such as shift work or jet lag.

=== Effects of insufficient sleep on objective performance and subjective alertness ===
Throughout her career, Klerman has also been interested in monitoring the effect of insufficient sleep (both deprivation [one continuous wake episode] and sleep restriction [multiple sleep episodes that are too short]) on objective performance (e.g., on cognitive tasks) and subjective alertness. Klerman also tested for an association between sleep loss and the ability to accurately self-judge alertness. In this study published in 2016, Klerman and colleagues found that subjective alertness by itself is a weak predictor of objective performance on a vigilance task.

=== Sleep need versus sleep ability ===
Klerman collaborated with Dr. Derk-Jan Dijk on research in younger and older adults about how much people will sleep when given extra time to sleep. They discovered that daytime sleep propensity and maximal capacity for sleep are greatly reduced in older adults. This research was important in its implications for understanding insomnia. In 2021, Klerman published a paper about the effects of extended sleep opportunity. The study found that most people probably do not obtain enough sleep when they choose their sleep times and durations, that several days and nights of extended sleep opportunity are required to reduce the sleep "debt", and that once there is no more sleep "debt', there is a very large night-to-night variation in sleep timing and duration. These results may be important for understanding some types of insomnia.

== Analysis and modeling of sleep and circadian rhythms ==
As the director of the Analytic and Modeling Unit in the Division of Sleep and Circadian Disorders at Brigham and Women's Hospital, Klerman has led circadian biology researchers as they have discovered new analytic techniques as well as new ways of modeling and simulating circadian rhythms.

== Collaborations ==
In her research, she has worked with 64 co-authors. Among the most common are Charles Czeisler, and with whom she has 48 co-publications, as well as Melissa April St Hilaire, who studies circadian biology through the lens of bioinformatics and with whom she has 18 publications. As part of her work, Klerman has mentored numerous undergraduate honors, dental, medical, and graduate students as well as post-doctoral fellows.

Klerman is currently the Director of Student Engagement in Clinical and Translational Research at Harvard Catalyst, an organization that provides resources to expand affiliated research endeavors.

=== Interactions with the broader community ===
Klerman has appeared on WCVB Channel 5 Boston, most recently (2023) discussing the negative effects that Daylight Savings Time and its associated sleep loss have on the lives of individuals who are already sleep-deprived. She has explained the long-term effects of obesity, mood disorders, and learning deficits connected to the loss of one hour of sleep.

== Awards and honors ==
Klerman's work has been cited over 7,000 times. Most notably, she has contributed to knowledge on the photic effects that affect circadian rhythms in the blind and the effects of sleep deprivation on overall cognitive and motor performance. Klerman has received various forms of funding throughout her career, including several NIH R01 grants. She was awarded a NIH K24 grant that supports the mentorship of individuals doing patient-oriented research. She was also nominated for a 2010–2011 Excellence in Mentoring Award from Harvard Medical School.

=== Selected list of achievements ===
- 2024 - Distinguished Scientist Award by Sleep Research Society
- 2014 - Awarded NASA JSC Director's Innovation Award as a member of the International Space Station Flexible Lighting Team
- 2013–present - International Academy of Astronautics Section 3 Life Sciences, (corresponding member from 2013-2017; full member as of 2017)
- 2009-2010 - Participant in Brigham and Women's Hospital's Center for Faculty Development and Diversity's Faculty Mentoring Leadership Program BWH
- 1999 - Participant in the AAMC Professional Development Seminar for Junior Women Faculty in Santa Fe, New Mexico
- 1982 - Phi Beta Kappa MIT

== Selected publications ==
- Abel, JH; Lecamwasam, K; Hilaire, MAS; Klerman, EB (2020). "Recent advances in modeling sleep: from the clinic to society and disease". Curr Opin Physiol. 15: 37–46. doi:10.1016/j.cophys.2019.12.001. PMC 8415470. PMID 34485783.
- Asgari-Targhi, A; Klerman, EB (2019). "Mathematical modeling of circadian rhythms". Wiley Interdiscip Rev Syst Biol Med. 11 e1439. doi:10.1002/wsbm.1439. PMC 6375788. PMID 30328684.
- McHill, AW; Phillips, AJ; Czeisler, CA; Keating, L; Yee, K; Barger, LK; Garaulet, M; Scheer, FA; Klerman, EB (2017). "Later circadian timing of food intake is associated with increased body fat". Am J Clin Nutr. 106: 1213–1219. doi:10.3945/ajcn.117.161588. PMC 5657289. PMID 28877894.
- Phillips, AJK; Clerx, WM; O'Brien, CS; Sano, A; Barger, LK; Picard, RW; Lockley, SW; Klerman, EB; Czeisler, CA (2017). "Irregular sleep/wake patterns are associated with poorer academic performance and delayed circadian and sleep/wake timing". Sci Rep. 7: 3216. doi:10.1038/s41598-017-03171-4. PMC 5468315. PMID 28607474.
- Bianchi, MT; Phillips, AJ; Wang, W; Klerman, EB (2017). "Statistics for Sleep and Biological Rhythms Research". J Biol Rhythms. 32: 7–17. doi:10.1177/0748730416670050. PMC 5501416. PMID 27836938.
- Klerman, EB; Wang, W; Phillips, AJ; Bianchi, MT (2017). "Statistics for Sleep and Biological Rhythms Research". J Biol Rhythms. 32: 18–25. doi:10.1177/0748730416670051. PMC 5483995. PMID 27836939.
- Benloucif, S; Burgess, HJ; Klerman, EB; et al. (February 2008). "Measuring melatonin in humans". J Clin Sleep Med. 4: 66–9. PMC 2276833. PMID 18350967..
- Klerman, EB; Gershengorn, HB; Duffy, JF; Kronauer, RE (April 2002). "Comparisons of the variability of three markers of the human circadian pacemaker". J. Biol. Rhythms. 17: 181–93. PMID 12002165..
- Czeisler, CA; Shanahan, TL; Klerman, EB; et al. (January 1995). "Suppression of melatonin secretion in some blind patients by exposure to bright light". N. Engl. J. Med. 332: 6–11. doi:10.1056/NEJM199501053320102. PMID 7990870..

== Relevant secondary sources ==
- Barinaga, Marcia (2002). "Setting the Human Clock: Technique Challenged". Science. 297 (5581): 505–505. JSTOR 3832129.
- Worth, Katie (2013). "Naps in Space". Scientific American. 308 (2): 18–18. JSTOR 26017933.
