= Start School Later =

American non-profit organization

- Formation: 2011
- Headquarters: Severna Park, Maryland, USA
- Executive Director, Co-Founder: Terra Ziporyn Snider
- Board of Directors President: Ann Gallagher
- Website: https://www.startschoollater.net

Start School Later, aka Healthy Hours, is a non-profit organization in the United States. Founded in 2011 after Maryland-based science writer Terra Ziporyn Snider started an online petition via We the People that brought together grassroots advocates, sleep researchers, pediatricians, social workers, and educators, the coalition aims to help communities delay school starting times; ensure safe, healthy school hours; and provide sleep education programs for students and school communities.

Start School Later currently has 166 volunteer-led chapters in 5 countries, including 34 US states and Washington, D.C., and has been featured in Beme, The Huffington Post, and Psychiatric News, and has received media coverage and editorial support in publications including The New York Times, The Wall Street Journal, NPR, BBC Brasil, WGBH, and The Washington Post. In 2013 U.S. Education Secretary Arne Duncan tweeted his support for later high school start times, and since 2014 the American Academy of Pediatrics, Centers for Disease Control and Prevention, and the American Medical Association, the Society of Behavioral Medicine, the American Academy of Sleep Medicine, and the American Association of Sleep Technologists have issued policy statements recommending that middle and high schools start no earlier than 8:30 a.m. In 2019 it sponsored with the California State PTA, the first US statewide legislation explicitly designed to protect and recognize the importance of adolescent sleep health by aligning secondary school hours with the substantial body of scientific evidence regarding adolescent sleep needs and timing.

In April 2017, Start School Later—together with the RAND Corporation, the Robert Wood Johnson Foundation, and Yale School of Medicine's Department of Pediatrics and Section on Pulmonary, Critical Care, and Sleep Medicine—co-sponsored the first Adolescent Sleep, Health, and School Start Times conference. In 2019, legislation co-sponsored by Start School Later and the California State PTA made California the first state in the nation to set a floor on how early middle and high schools can require attendance. In 2021, Start School Later received the American Academy of Sleep Medicine Foundation's Sleep Champion Award.
