= Wallace B. Mendelson =

American psychiatrist and author

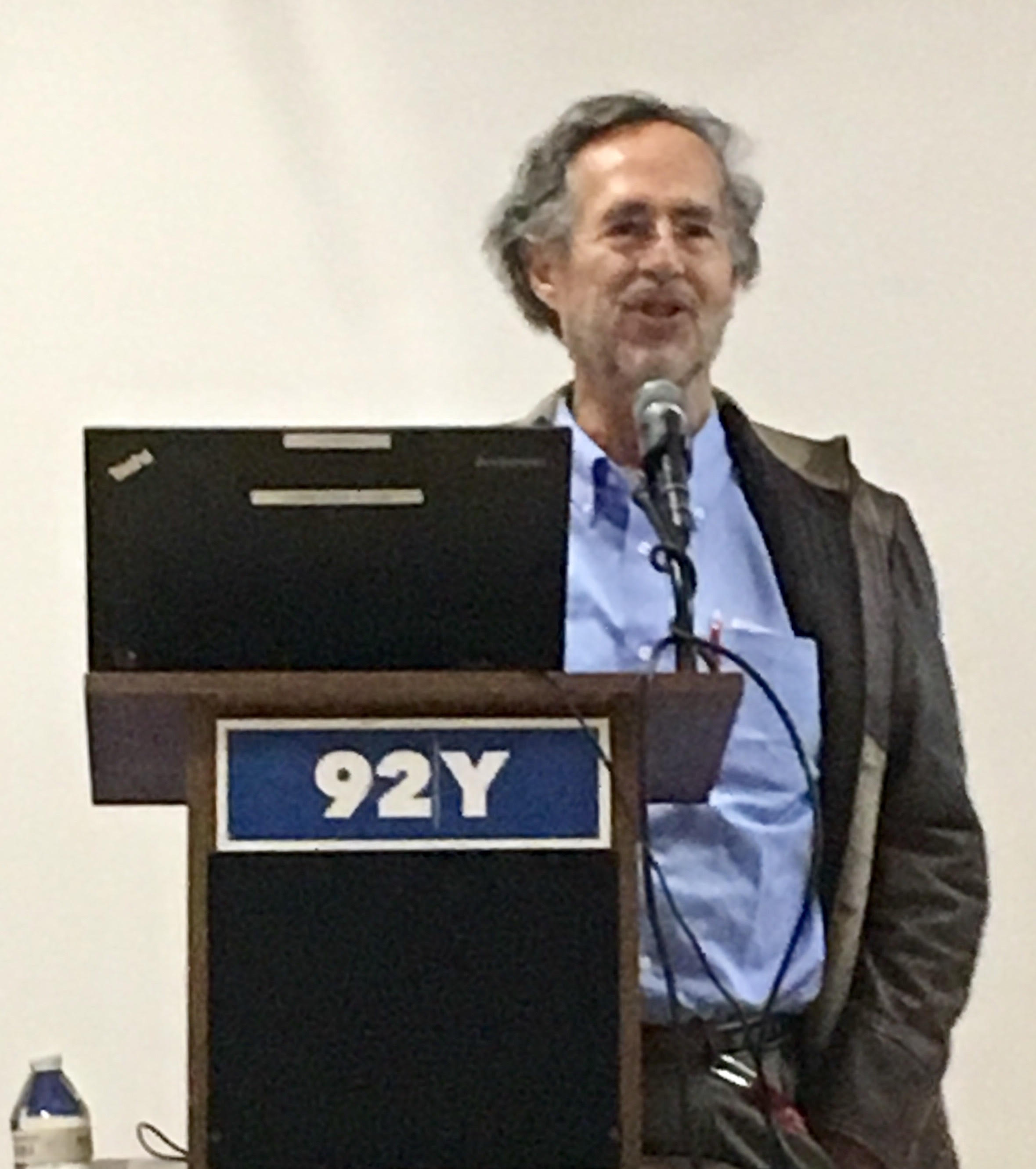
- Wallace B. Mendelson giving a lecture in New York, 2018
- Born: 1945 (age 80–81)
- Education: University of Texas at Austin (BA); Washington University in St. Louis (MD)
- Occupations: Psychiatrist; author
- Medical career
- Institutions: Washington University School of Medicine; University of Chicago; Cleveland Clinic; Stony Brook University; National Institute of Mental Health
- Research: Sleep; psychopharmacology

Wallace B. Mendelson is an American psychiatrist and author. Working primarily in the fields of sleep research and psychopharmacology, he most recently worked at the Pritzker School of Medicine as a professor of psychiatry and clinical pharmacology and the director of the school's Sleep Research Laboratory. He is the author of sixteen books and numerous papers in the fields of sleep science, pharmacology and history of science.

== Education ==
Mendelson earned his Bachelor of Arts in 1965 from the University of Texas at Austin. He then went on to Washington University in St. Louis where he earned his Doctor of Medicine in 1969. He completed his residency in psychiatry and taught at Washington University School of Medicine.

== Career ==
After Washington University, in 1975 Mendelson took a position at the Intramural Program of the National Institute of Mental Health (NIMH) in Bethesda, Maryland where he was the Chief, Section on Sleep Studies until 1987. While with the NIMH, Mendelson published two books: Human Sleep and Its Disorders (1977) and The Use and Misuse of Sleeping Pills (1980). After the NIMH, Mendelson became the director of the Center for the Study of Sleep and Waking at Stony Brook University and held a professorship there. He also published his third book while at Stony Brook called Human Sleep: Research and Clinical Care in 1987. In 1994, he was named the director of the Sleep Disorders Center at the Cleveland Clinic in Cleveland, Ohio.

From 1997 to 1998, Mendelson served as the President of the Sleep Research Society. He began working at the University of Chicago as a professor of psychiatry and clinical pharmacology and the director of the Sleep Research Laboratory. He retired from full-time university work in the early 2000s and has subsequently been writing, consulting, and in the part-time practice of general psychiatry. During his tenures at Stony Brook, the Cleveland Clinic, and The University of Chicago, he set up three accredited fellowship training programs in sleep medicine. Since 2017, Mendelson published a number of books, including The Science of Sleep, Understanding Antidepressants, Understanding Sleeping Pills, Understanding Medicines for Anxiety, The Curious History of Medicines in Psychiatry, Molecules, Madness, and Malaria, Nepenthe's Children, Trial by Fire, Fragile Brilliance, The Psychoanalyst and The Nazi Nobelist, The Battle Over the Butterflies of the Soul, From Despair to Discovery and Pharmacy of the Mind

== Research ==
Mendelson is known for basic science studies elucidating the effects of inverse agonists of the benzodiazepine receptor, the actions of endogenous ligands for benzodiazepine receptors, and the role of the medial preoptic area in pharmacologic sleep induction. At a human research level he characterized differences in regulation of growth hormone secretion during sleep and waking, effects of drugs on the perception of being awake or asleep, the interaction of sleep and depression, and the clinical properties of sleep-inducing medicines. Mendelson has been described as a "pioneer in the field of sleep research and sleep medicine, and is a well-respected psychiatrist, scientist, and sleep educator." In 2022 he was designated a 'Living Legend in Sleep Research' by the journal Sleep Advances in which he published a history of his work, memories of colleagues and mentors, and thoughts for the future.

== Bibliography ==
Year	Title	Original publisher	ISBN	Notes
1977	Human Sleep and Its Disorders	Plenum Press	ISBN 978-1468422917	Co-written with J. Christian Gillin and Richard Jed Wyatt
1980	The Use and Misuse of Sleeping Pills	Plenum Medical Book Company	ISBN 978-0306403705	
1987	Human Sleep: Research and Clinical Care	Plenum Medical Book Company	ISBN 978-0306426278	
2017	The Science of Sleep: What It Is, How It Works, and Why It Matters	University of Chicago Press	ISBN 978-0226387161	
2018	Understanding Antidepressants	Independent	ISBN 978-1980438298	
2018	Understanding Sleeping Pills	Independent	ISBN 978-1718039988	
2019	Understanding Medicines for Anxiety	Independent	ISBN 978-1075931802	
2020	The Curious History of Medicines in Psychiatry	Pythagoras Press	ISBN 978-0578637877	
2020	Molecules, Madness, and Malaria: How Victorian Fabric Dyes Evolved into Modern Medicines for Mental Illness and Infectious Disease	Pythagoras Press	ISBN 978-0578697208	
2020	Nepenthe's Children: The History of the Discoveries of Medicines for Sleep and Anesthesia	Pythagoras Press	ISBN 978-1735334318	
2021	Trial by Fire: World War II and the Founders of Modern Neuroscience and Psychopharmacology	Pythagoras Press	ISBN 978-1-7353343-7-0	
2021	Fragile Brilliance: The Troubled Lives of Herman Melville, Edgar Allan Poe, Emily Dickinson and other Great Authors	Pythagoras Press	ISBN 978-1-7353343-6-3	
2022	The Psychoanalyst and The Nazi Nobelist: The Curious Story of Sigmund Freud and Julius Wagner-Jauregg	Pythagoras Press	ISBN 978-1-7353343-5-6	
2023	The Battle Over the Butterflies of the Soul: Camillo Golgi, Santiago Ramón y Cajal and The Birth of Neuroscience	Pythagoras Press	ISBN 978-1-7353343-8-7	
2024	From Despair to Discovery: The Botanical Odyssey of Matthias Jakob Schleiden and The Dawn of Cell Theory	Pythagoras Press	ISBN 978-1-7353343-9-4	
2025	Pharmacy of the Mind: The Uncanny Origins of Psychiatric Drugs, and The World That Shaped Them	Pythagoras Press	ISBN 979-8-9913210-0-6	
2025	The Discordant Forge: How Johannes Muller, Theodor Meynert, and their rebellious students shaped 19th century scientific thought.	Pythagoras Press	ISBN 979-8-9913210-2-0	
2026	Gilles de la Tourette: His life, work and world.	Pythagoras Press	ISBN 979-8-9913210-5-1	
