= Terra Ziporyn =

American writer (born 1958)

Terra Ziporyn (born 1958) is an American science writer, novelist, playwright, and public health advocate whose books include The New Harvard Guide to Women's Health, Alternative Medicine for Dummies, and Nameless Diseases. She has written on a wide range of health and medical issues for both medical professionals and the general public in publications including The Harvard Health Letter, JAMA, Consumer Reports, CNN, Education Week, Weight Watchers Magazine, Business Week, The Missouri Review, and The Huffington Post. As Terra Ziporyn Snider, her married name, she co-founded and became executive director of Start School Later, a public-health non-profit organization. She lives in Severna Park, Maryland with her husband J.H. Snider. She is the sister of Brook Ziporyn and Evan Ziporyn.

== Education and career ==
Ziporyn graduated from Evanston Township High School in 1976. She received a BA in both history and biology (summa cum laude, Phi Beta Kappa) from Yale University, where she was the arts editor of the Yale Daily News. She earned an MA and PhD in the history of science and medicine as a Searle Fellow at the University of Chicago, where she conducted research in biopsychology in the laboratory of Martha McClintock. Ziporyn's dissertation, supervised by Lester S. King and published as Disease in the Popular American Press, focused on relationship between science and society. Ziporyn studied fiction and screenwriting at the Bread Loaf Writers Conference, Old Chatham Writers Conference, and Columbia College, and playwriting with Ted Tally at Yale University and Theatre Building Chicago's New Tuners Workshop.

In 1984 Ziporyn became an associate editor of the Journal of the American Medical Association (JAMA) and in 1985 began freelancing for publications including The Harvard Health Letter, JAMA, Consumer Reports, CNN, Education Week, Weight Watchers Magazine, Business Week, The Missouri Review, and The Huffington Post. She was awarded a AAAS Mass Media Science Fellowship in 1979. She later received science writing fellowships from the American Chemical Society (1992) and the Marine Biological Laboratory at Woods Hole (1997). In 2011 Ziporyn co-founded and became executive director of Start School Later, a 501(c)(3) organization comprising health professionals, sleep scientists, educators, parents, students, and other concerned citizens dedicated to raising awareness about adolescent sleep and helping communities ensure safe, healthy, and equitable school hours where students have an opportunity to get healthy sleep. Her writing about translating sleep research into school policy has been published in Sleep Science (Oxford University Press) Sleep, Health, and Society (Oxford University Press), and Sleep Health, the peer-reviewed journal of the National Sleep Foundation. She received the 2022 Public Service Award from the Sleep Research Society.

== Selected works ==
=== Non-fiction books ===
- The New Harvard Guide to Women's Health (co-authored with Karen Carlson and Stephanie Eisenstat). Harvard University Press, 2004. Health Information Resource Center's 1998 National Health Information Award in the book category of health promotion/disease and injury prevention information. Translated into Greek, Hebrew, Russian, Italian, Chinese, and Polish language editions.
- Alternative Medicine for Dummies (co-authored with James Dillard). John Wiley & Sons,1998. Received the American Medical Writers Association Beth Fonda Award for excellence in medical communication for a lay audience.
- Alternative Medicine for Dummies. Harper Audio, 1998.
- The Harvard Guide to Women's Health (co-authored with Karen Carlson and Stephanie Eisenstat). Harvard University Press and Pilgrim New Media, 1997.
- The Women's Concise Guide to Emotional Well-Being (co-authored with Karen Carlson and Stephanie Eisenstat). Harvard University Press, 1997.
- The Women's Concise Guide to a Healthier Heart (co-authored with Karen Carlson and Stephanie Eisenstat). Harvard University Press, 1997.
- The Harvard Guide to Women's Health Cambridge (co-authored with Karen Carlson and Stephanie Eisenstat), 1996. CD version, 1997 via Pilgrim New Media.
- Nameless Diseases. Rutgers University Press, 1992.
- Future Shop: How New Technologies Will Change The Way We Shop and What We Buy. (co-authored with Jim Snider). St. Martin's Press, 1992
- Disease in The Popular American Press: The Case of Diphtheria, Typhoid Fever, and Syphilis, 1870-1920 Greenwood Press, 1988.

=== Fiction and plays ===
- Permanent Makeup. Palta Books, 2014.
- Do Not Go Gentle. iUniverse, 2006.
- The Bliss of Solitude. Xlibris, 2002.
- ·Time's Fool. Xlibris, 2001. 1st Prize for Historical Fiction, Maryland Writers Association.
- ·Cupidity. Premiered at Yale University, April 2016.
- The List. Read at Baltimore Playwrights Festival (Mobtown Playhouse), 2004.
- To Be An Eagle! (Terra Ziporyn, book; Jim Hughes, lyrics; Lita Grier, music).
