= Journal of Clinical Sleep Medicine =

- Discipline: Sleep medicine
- Language: English
- Edited by: M. Safwan Badr

Publication details
- History: Since 2005
- Publisher: Springer Science+Business Media
- Frequency: Continuous
- Open access: Hybrid
- Impact factor: 3.4 (2025)

Standard abbreviations
- ISO 4: J. Clin. Sleep Med.

Indexing
- ISSN: 1550-9389 (print); 1550-9397 (web)

Links
- Journal homepage; Online access; Online archive

The Journal of Clinical Sleep Medicine is a peer-reviewed medical journal covering sleep medicine. It was established in 2005 and is published by Springer Science+Business Media on behalf of the American Academy of Sleep Medicine of which it is the official journal. Its founding editor-in-chief was Stuart F. Quan (Harvard University/University of Arizona), and the current editor-in-chief is M. Safwan Badr (Wayne State University).

== Impact ==
According to the Journal Citation Reports, the journal has a 2025 impact factor of 3.4 and a 5-year impact factor of 4.3.

== Indexing ==
The journal is abstracted and indexed in:

- EBSCO databases
- Embase
- MEDLINE
- ProQuest databases
- Scopus
- Science Citation Index Expanded
