= Evan Ziporyn =

American composer

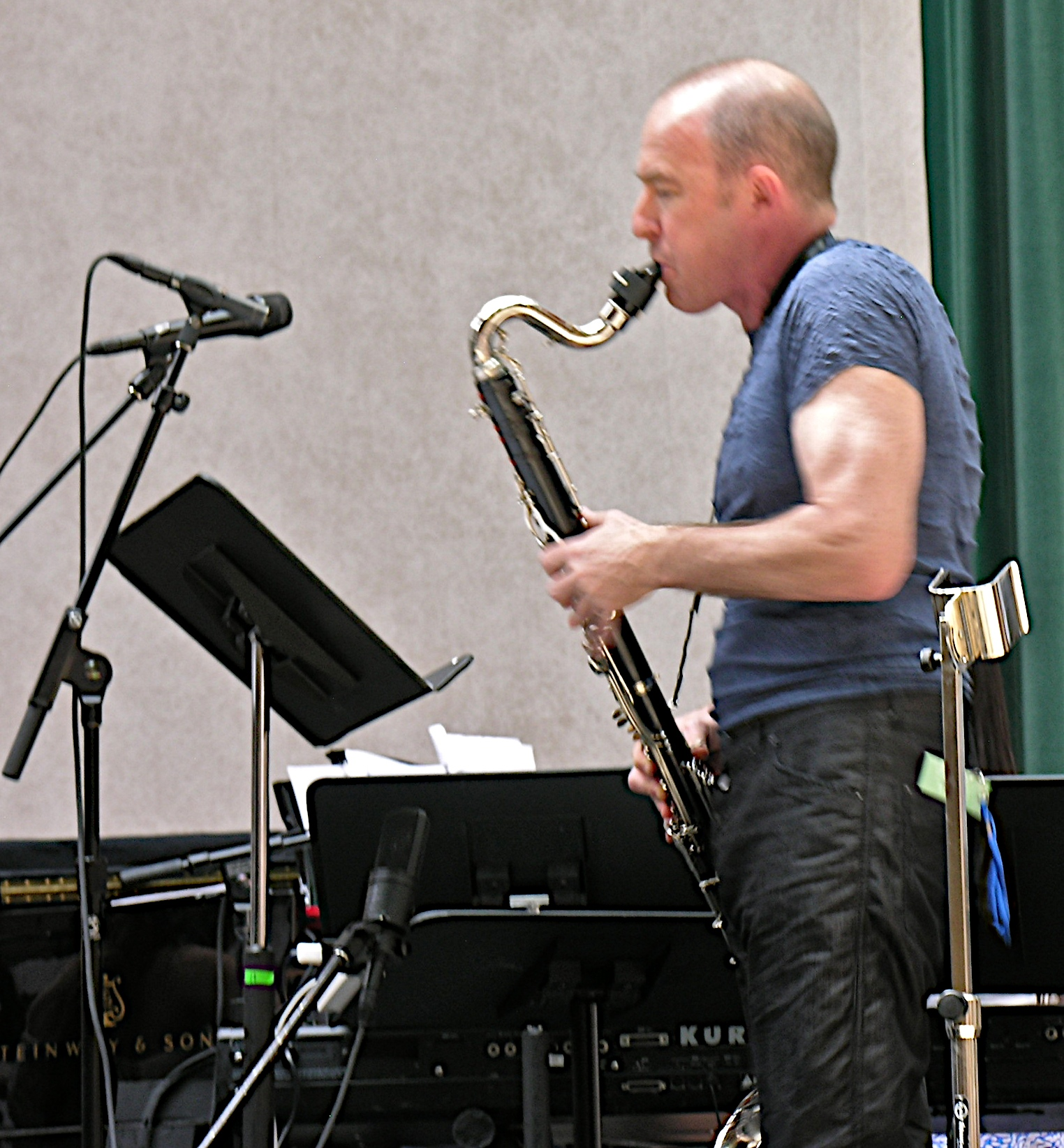

Evan Ziporyn (b. Chicago, Illinois, December 14, 1959) is an American composer of post-minimalist music with a cross-cultural orientation, drawing equally from classical music, avant-garde, various world music traditions, and jazz. Ziporyn has composed for a wide range of ensembles, including symphony orchestras, wind ensembles, many types of chamber groups, and solo instruments, sometimes involving electronics. He has composed numerous works for Balinese gamelan. He is known for his solo performances on clarinet and bass clarinet; additionally, Ziporyn plays gender wayang and other Balinese instruments, saxophones, piano and keyboards, EWI, and Shona mbira.

Ziporyn is the Kenan Sahin Distinguished Professor of Music at the Massachusetts Institute of Technology as well as director of MIT's Center for Art, Science & Technology (CAST). At MIT he directs Gamelan Galak Tika, an ensemble he founded in 1993, a group of 30 MIT students, staff and community members, devoted to the study and performance of new works for Balinese Gamelan.

He is currently a member of the Eviyan Trio, with Czech violinist and vocalist Iva Bittová and American guitarist Gyan Riley.

He has released albums on Cantaloupe, New Albion, New World, Victo, Airplane Ears, and CRI Emergency Music; his works have also been recorded on Naxos, Koch, Innova, and World Village. As a performer, he has recorded for Nonesuch, Sony Classical, and Point Music, among others. He has composed music for a wide range of ensembles worldwide, including Yo-Yo Ma's Silk Road Project, the American Composers Orchestra, the Boston Modern Orchestra Project, the Kronos Quartet, Brooklyn Rider, Ethel, cellist Maya Beiser, the Netherlands Wind Ensemble, the MIT Wind Ensemble, Gamelan Sekar Jaya, Sentieri Selvaggi, Gamelan Salukat, and Gamelan Semara Ratih.

Evan Ziporyn was named a 2007 USA Walker Fellow by United States Artists, an arts advocacy foundation dedicated to the support and promotion of America's top living artists.

He was born in Chicago, Illinois and now lives in Lexington, Massachusetts with composer Christine Southworth. He is the brother of Brook Ziporyn and Terra Ziporyn Snider, and has two children, Leonardo Ziporyn and Ava Ziporyn.

== Career ==
Ziporyn studied at Eastman, Yale, and UC Berkeley with Joseph Schwantner, Martin Bresnick, and Gerard Grisey. He first traveled to Bali in 1981, studying with Madé Lebah, Colin McPhee's 1930s musical informant. He returned on a Fulbright in 1987. While living on the US west coast during the 1980s he was a member of Gamelan Sekar Jaya. The three compositions he composed for Sekar Jaya all included western instruments.

He performed a clarinet solo at the First Bang on a Can Marathon in New York. His involvement with BOAC continued for 25 years: in 1992 he co-founded the Bang on a Can All-Stars (Musical America's 2005 Ensemble of the Year), with whom he toured the globe and premiered over 100 commissioned works, collaborating with Nik Bärtsch, Iva Bittová, Don Byron, Ornette Coleman, Brian Eno, Philip Glass, Meredith Monk, Thurston Moore, Terry Riley, and Tan Dun. He co-produced their seminal 1996 recording of Brian Eno's Music for Airports, as well as their 2012 Big Beautiful Dark & Scary (2012). He left the group in the fall of that year to form Eviyan with Iva Bittová and Gyan Riley, with whom he now concertizes and records regularly. In the fall of 2013 he founded the Critical Band, a group devoted to the music of the late British composer Steve Martland.

Ziporyn joined the MIT faculty in 1990, founding Gamelan Galak Tika there in 1993, and continued a series of compositions for gamelan and western instruments. These include three evening-length works, 2001's ShadowBang, 2004's Oedipus Rex at the American Repertory Theater (Robert Woodruff, director), and 2009's A House in Bali, an opera about composer Colin McPhee, anthropologist Margaret Mead, and artist Walter Spies. A House in Bali joined Western singers Anne Harley, Marc Molomot, and Timur Bekbosunov with Balinese traditional performers Nyoman Catra and Desak Made Suari Laksmi, and Bang on a Can All-Stars with a full gamelan ensemble. It received its world premiere in Bali that summer and its New York premiere at BAM Next Wave in October 2010.

Ziporyn was also a member of Steve Reich and Musicians, with whom he shared a 1998 Grammy Award for Best Chamber Music Performance.

In 1996, Ziporyn recorded Steve Reich's 1985 multi-clarinet work New York Counterpoint.

In 2001 his solo clarinet CD, This is Not A Clarinet, made Top Ten lists across the country. His compositions have been commissioned by Yo-Yo Ma's Silk Road Ensemble, Kronos Quartet, American Composers Orchestra, Maya Beiser, Sō Percussion, Wu Man, and the Boston Modern Orchestra Project, with whom he recorded two CDs, Frog's Eye (2006) and Big Grenadilla/Mumbai (2012). His honors include awards from the Massachusetts Cultural Council (2011), The Herb Alpert Foundation (2011), USA Artists Walker Fellowship (2007), MIT's Kepes Prize (2006), and the American Academy of Arts and Letters Goddard Lieberson Fellowship (2004), as well as commissions from Meet the Composer/Commissioning Music USA and the Rockefeller MAP Fund.

He is Kenan Sahin Distinguished Professor of Music at MIT. He has also been inaugural director of MIT's new Center for Art, Science & Technology and still serves as its head of Music and Theater Arts. He is also founder and artistic director of Gamelan Galak Tika, and curator of the MIT Sounding performance series.

== Recordings ==
- Connect4 (2020) CD Nut Trytone Records TT0559-088 Fie Schouten, Jelte Althuis (bass clarinet), Tatiana Koleva vibraphone, Eva van de Poll violoncello
- Eviyan Live

November 2013, Les Disques Victo
Iva Bittová (violin/voice), Gyan Riley (guitar), Evan Ziporyn (clarinet/bass clarinet)
Compositions and improvisations by Bittová, Riley, and Ziporyn

- In My Mind and In My Car

October 2013, Airplane Ears Music
Clarinet / Bass Clarinet performed by Evan Ziporyn
Electronics and composition by Christine Southworth and Evan Ziporyn

- Big Grenadilla / Mumbai

April 2012, Cantaloupe Records
Big Grenadilla (Evan Ziporyn, bass clarinet)
Mumbai (Sandeep Das, tabla)
Boston Modern Orchestra Project, Gil Rose, conductor

- Frog's Eye

October 2006, Cantaloupe Records
Performed by the Boston Modern Orchestra Project.
Frog's Eye, The Ornate Zither and the Nomad Flute (Anne Harley, soprano), War Chant, Drill

- Typical Music

November 2005, New Albion Records
Pondok (Sarah Cahill, piano)
Typical Music (Arden Trio)
Ngaben (Gamelan Galak Tika w/ New England Conservatory Philharmonia Dante Anzolini, director)

- Shadowbang

June 2003, Cantaloupe Records
Bang on a Can All-Stars with Wayan Wija, dalang

- This is Not a Clarinet

July 2001, Cantaloupe Records
Partial Truths
Four Impersonations: Honshirabe, Pengrangrang Gede, Thum Nyatiti, Bindu Semara
Three Island Duos by Michael Tenzer
Press Release by David Lang

- Evan Ziporyn: Gamelan Galak Tika

May 2000, New World Records
Amok
Tire Fire

- Animal Act

CRI Emergency Music 1993
What She Saw There
Tree Frog
Waiting by the Phone
Walk the Dog

- American Works for Balinese Gamelan

New World Records 1993
Banyuari by Michael Tenzer, Situ Banda by Michael Tenzer, Khayalan Tiga by Wayne Vitale, Aneh Tapi Nyata by Evan Ziporyn, Kekembangan by I Nyoman Windha & Evan Ziporyn
Performed by Gamelan Sekar Jaya

== Works ==
=== Works for clarinet / bass clarinet ===
- Notes to Self (2010) 15' – solo bass clarinet
- Hive (2007) 17' clarinet quartet – 2 clarinets, 2 bass clarinets
- Big Grenadilla (2006) 15' – concerto for bass clarinet and chamber orchestra
- Drill (2002) 10' – concerto for solo bass clarinet with wind ensemble
- Four Impersonations (1999) 18' – solo clarinet

Honshirabe (4:00) Bindu Semara (5:30) Thum Nyatiti (2:30) Pengrangrang Gede (5:30)

- Partial Truths (1999) 17' – solo bass clarinet
- Tsmindao Ghmerto (1995) 7' – solo bass clarinet and wind ensemble
- Tsmindao Ghmerto (1994) 4' – solo bass clarinet
- Walk the Dog (1990) 25' – bass clarinet and electronics
- Be-In (1990) 9' – bass clarinet and string quartet
- What She Saw There (1988) 13' – bass clarinet (or cello) and 2 marimbists
- Waiting By The Phone (1986) 12' – solo clarinet
- Two Obsessions (1980) 15' – solo clarinet

=== Works for gamelan ===
- Hujan Arja (2012) 12' – Balinese gamelan semara dana (7-toned gong kebyar)
- Lapanbelas (2010) 18' – Balinese gamelan semara dana (7-toned gong kebyar)
- Bali Tiba (from A House in Bali) (2009) 7' – Balinese gamelan gong kebyar
- Bayu Sabda Idep (2007) 27' – just intonation slendro chamber gamelan and chamber string orchestra
- Cu(Bali)Bre (2007) 3'30" – gender wayang duo
- Sabar Gong (2005) 5' (in collaboration w/Lamine Touré) – Balinese gamelan with Senegalese Sabar drums
- Aradhana (2004) 15' – Balinese gamelan with Chinese pipa
- Ngaben (for Sari Club) (2003) 15' – Balinese gamelan & orchestra
- Kebyar Kebyar (2002) 7' – Balinese gamelan gong kebyar
- Amok! (1996) 32' – six movements for Balinese gamelan, double bass (or cello), percussion sampler, keyboard sampler
- Tire Fire (1994) 25' – Balinese gamelan, two electric guitars, electric bass, and keyboard (or mandolin)
- Aneh Tapi Nyata (1992) 14' – chamber ensemble and Balinese percussion
- Kekembangan (1990) 16' (in collaboration with I Nyoman Windha) – saxophone quartet and Balinese gamelan
- Night Bus (1990) 12' – Sundanese gamelan (commissioned by the Toronto Border Crossings Festival for the Evergreen Club)

=== Theater ===
- A House in Bali (2009) 90' – opera based on the memoir of Colin McPhee, for amplified sextet (guitar, percussion, piano, violin, cello, bass), Balinese gamelan, two tenors, one soprano, and four Balinese actors/dancers
- Oedipus Rex (2004) 90' – Greek choruses and onstage incidental music for the American Repertory Theater production of the original Sophocles tragedy. Directed by Robert Woodruff, Loeb Theater, Cambridge, MA
- ShadowBang (2001) 90' – full-length theater work for Balinese dalang (shadow puppeteer) and Bang on a Can All-Stars.

Commissioned by Rockefeller Multi-Arts Program for I Wayan Wija and Bang on a Can All-Stars; premiered October 2001 at MIT Kresge Auditorium, Cambridge, and MassMOCA, North Adams, Massachusetts

=== Orchestra ===
- Tabla Concerto: Mumbai (2011) 25' – tabla solo, strings, and percussion

commissioned by Meet the Composer

- Hard Drive (2007) 18' – orchestra with electric guitar
- Bayu Sabda Idep (2007) 27' – chamber string orchestra with gamelan
- Big Grenadilla (2006) 15' – orchestra and solo bass clarinet
- War Chant (2004) 15' – orchestra with Hawaiian-style lap steel guitar

commissioned by Boston Modern Orchestra Project

- Ngaben (for Sari Club) (2003) 15' – orchestra with gamelan

commissioned by the New England Conservatory; world premiere Jordan Hall, Boston, March 12, 2003, by Gamelan Galak Tika and the NEC Symphony, Dante Anzolini, conductor

- Frog's Eye (2002) 13' – chamber orchestra

commissioned and premiered by Boston Pro Arte Orchestra, Isaiah Jackson, conductor, October 2002

- Filling Station (1986) 12' – orchestra premiered by UC Berkeley Symphony, Evan Ziporyn, conductor, October 1986
- Pleasureville, Pain City (1985) 6' – premiered by UC Berkeley Symphony, John Sackett, conductor, February 1985

=== Wind ensemble ===
- The Ornate Zither and the Nomad Flute (2005) 15' – for solo soprano and wind ensemble

premiered March 2005 by Anne Harley with MIT Wind Ensemble, Fred Harris, director
Commissioned by Richard Nordlof.

- Drill (2002) 10' – concerto for solo bass clarinet with wind ensemble

premiered by Ziporyn and MIT WindEnsemble, Fred Harris, director

- Tsmindao Ghmerto (1995) 7' – solo bass clarinet and wind ensemble

commissioned and premiered by Nederlands Blazers, New Years Day 1996

- Houtman's Men in Buleleng (1996) 15'

for Orkest de Volharding, premiered at Ijsbreker, Amsterdam

=== Chamber music ===
==== Standard ensembles ====
- Where Was I? (2008) 25' – cello, piano, percussion
- Hive (2007) 17' – clarinet quartet – 2 clarinets, 2 bass clarinets
- Speak, At-man! (2006) 10' – alto flute and piano
- Breathing Space (2003) 20' – three movements for string quartet

commissioned and premiered by Ethel, Miller Theater, New York, April 2003

- Typical Music (2000) 30' – three movements for piano trio

commissioned by Reader's Digest/Meet the Composer and the Sun Valley Center for the Arts for the Arden Trio, premiered Ketchum, Idaho, January 2001

- Melody Competition (1999, rev. 2000) 21' – for percussion sextet

commissioned and premiered by red fish blue fish, Steven Schick, director; UCSD, La Jolla, California, May 1999

- Dreams of a Dominant Culture (1997) 20' – for flute, clarinet, percussion, electric piano, violin, cello

commissioned and premiered by Boston Musica Viva, Richard Pittman, conductor; Longy School, Cambridge, October 1997

- Eel Bone (1996) 13' – string quartet

commissioned and premiered by Kronos Quartet, San Francisco, May 1996

- Kebyar Maya (1995) 14' – cello octet

commissioned by Rockefeller Multi-Arts Program for Maya Beiser

- Be-In (1991) 11' – multiple versions: string quartet and bass clarinet/bassoon/double bass, clarinet, mandolin, cello, electric piano, double bass, hand percussion
- Bossa Nova for brass quintet (1991) 3' – commissioned by MIT for the inauguration of President Charles Vest
- Dog Dream (1990) 12' – flute, clarinet, percussion, piano, violin, cello, electric guitar

commissioned and premiered by California EAR Unit, LA County Museum

- Ten String Quartets (1979) 10'

==== Non-standard ensembles ====
- Sulvasutra (2006) 18' – string quartet, pipa, and tabla

commissioned by the Silk Road Project

- Belle Labs (2006) 20' – violin, clarinet, and robotic xylophone (Heliphon)

commissioned by Ensemble Robot and Boston Museum of Science, premiered January 25, 2005, by Evan Ziporyn and Todd Reynolds

- Thread (2005) 25' – clarinet, alto and bass flute, violin, cello

commissioned and premiered by Dinosaur Annex, Cambridge, June 2005

- No Return (2002) 30' – 4 movements for violin, clarinet, and sounds of the Salmon River

commissioned by Sun Valley Center for the Arts and premiered by Todd Reynolds and Evan Ziporyn, Ketchum, ID, January 2003

- More Songs About Telephones and Dogs (2002) 20' – 4 movements for mixed ensemble – 'Iris in Furs' 'Jubilee of Indifference' '...no messages...' 'Dog Heaven'

commissioned by The Kitchen for Kitchen House Blend, premiered December 2002

- Tight Fitting Garments 15' – violin and clarinet: "It Is And It Isn't," "Illusions of Purity," "Jubilee of Indifference"
- Serenity Now (1998) 5'

commissioned by Chamber Music Conference of the East, Bennington, Vermont

- Pay Phone (1993) – violin, viola, electric guitar, bass clarinet, keyboard for the Michael Gordon Philharmonic
- Esto House (1993) 10' – violin, viola, electric guitar, bass clarinet, keyboard for the Michael Gordon Philharmonic
- China Spring (1991) 15' – for oboe and piano, commissioned by Peter Cooper and premiered by Cooper and Ziporyn
- Tree Frog (1990) 25' – bass clarinet, baritone saxophone, trombone, percussion, keyboard, violin; commissioned by Toronto Border Crossings Festival for Sound Pressure, premiered at the Music Gallery, Toronto, May 1990
- Twine (1985) 12' – three movements for soprano, two saxophones, bass clarinet, violin, viola, percussion
- LUVTime (1984) 15' – three movements for bass clarinet, baritone saxophone, trombone, percussion, piano

=== Works for one ===
==== Solo piano ====
- In Bounds (2004)
- Pondok (2000) 21'

four movements – 'Fragrant Forest' (4:30), 'Tree Trunk' (3:45), 'Ginoman' (2:00), 'Gebyog (Husk)' (10:00)
commissioned and premiered by Sarah Cahill

- Fractal-Head (1987) 15'
- Some Coal, ten movements (1985) 30'
- The Water's Fine (1983) 30' – premiered by Michael Orland
- Weltscenen (1981) 20' – premiered by Christopher Oldfather

==== Solo pieces for other instruments ====
- Hval (2007) – solo bass, commissioned by Robert Black
- Current Rate (1999) 15' – solo Chinese pipa and pre-recorded CD (or two pipa), commissioned and premiered by Wu Man at Bang on a Can Women and Music, Henry Street Settlement
- Kebyar Maya (1995) 14' – solo cello and prerecorded CD, commissioned by Rockefeller Multi-Arts Program for Maya Beiser
- Studies in Normative Behaviour, Vol 1 (1991) 10' – solo percussionist, commissioned and premiered by Danny Tunick
- The Motions (1990) 9' – solo viola (or viola and CD), premiered by John Lad
