= Journal of Pineal Research =

- Discipline: Endocrinology
- Language: English
- Edited by: Gianluca Tosini

Publication details
- History: 1984-present
- Publisher: John Wiley & Sons
- Frequency: 8/year
- Impact factor: 13.007 (2020)

Standard abbreviations
- ISO 4: J. Pineal Res.

Indexing
- CODEN: JPRSE9
- ISSN: 0742-3098 (print); 1600-079X (web)
- LCCN: 84650615
- OCLC no.: 47858810

Links
- Journal homepage; Online access; Online archive

Journal of Pineal Research is a peer-reviewed scientific journal covering research on the pineal gland and its hormonal products, chiefly melatonin, in all vertebrate species. Experimental studies on circadian rhythms and sleep are also published by the journal. It is published by John Wiley & Sons and the editor-in-chief is Gianluca Tosini. According to the Journal Citation Reports, the journal has a 2020 impact factor of 13.007.
