= Allan Rechtschaffen =

American sleep researcher (1927–2021)

Allan Rechtschaffen (December 8, 1927 – November 29, 2021) was a noted pioneer in the field of sleep research whose work includes some of the first laboratory studies of insomnia, narcolepsy, sleep apnea, and napping. He received his PhD from Northwestern University in 1956.

He did research in the effects on sleep of exercise, mental work, stimulation, stress, and metabolism, as well as the effects of sleep deprivation. He also looked at sleep in reptiles and rats.

Dr. Rechtschaffen and Gerry Vogel, working with colleagues at Mt. Sinai Hospital in New York including Dr. William Dement, described narcolepsy—the first scientifically demonstrated sleep disorder—in a landmark paper in 1963. Dr. Rechtschaffen went on to perform experiments in rats that demonstrated the lethal consequences of long-term (two weeks or more) sleep deprivation and REM sleep deprivation.

He worked with Anthony Kales in developing the still-used criteria used by sleep laboratories to report human sleep scale data. The system is commonly called R&K or Rechtschaffen and Kales, named after its key developers. R&K was used from 1968 to 2007 when The AASM Manual for the Scoring of Sleep and Associated Events was published by the American Academy of Sleep Medicine (AASM).

At the time of his death, Rechtschaffen, who was born in the Bronx, was Professor Emeritus in the Department of Psychiatry and Psychology at the University of Chicago. His family name means "upright" in German. He is the uncle of the author Daniel Mendelsohn and filmmaker Eric Mendelsohn. He was the only child of Austrian-born Sosia (Sylvia) Jager and Philip Rechtschaffen.
