= Claudio Stampi =

Italian sleep researcher

Claudio Stampi (born 19 June 1953, in São Paulo, Brazil) is the founder (in 1997), director and sole proprietor of the Chronobiology Research Institute which he runs from his home in Newton, Massachusetts, US. He is an academic sleep-researcher with a particular interest in the use of short naps in extreme conditions.

== Life ==
Born to Italian parents in Brazil, he moved to Italy as a teenager and earned a doctorate in medicine in 1977, followed by a Ph.D. in biomedical engineering in 1983, and a degree in neurology the following year from the University of Bologna in Italy. An avid sailor since his early youth, his MD-thesis was based on data he had collected during the 1975 Clipper Race, the first race he participated in, on the performance in relation to their sleep habits of the six team members on board.

That marked the start of his particular research interest in chronobiology, leading him to follow a number of his fellow long distance sail boat racing comrades, who had adopted a systematic polyphasic sleep pattern with minimal impairment. Stampi participated in two global sail races, including the 1981-2 Whitbread Race, where he served as Chief Scientist and Skipper of the research yacht La Barca Laboratorio; a boat that did not finish the race.

Building on his experience, he continued in the following years to work as a consultant for many single-hand competitive sailors to help them adapt their on-board sleeping habits for maximum performance. Among his most notable clients were Mike Golding and famous sailor Ellen MacArthur, who won the Transat in 2000 and beat a new record for a single-handed global circumnavigation following his napping advice. James Maas, a professor specialised in the same field at Cornell University in the US, praised Stampi's empirical work based on the observation of more than 100 solo sailors as very useful. While his consulting activity, side by side with his ongoing research, mainly benefitted sailors, he also worked for NASA astronauts, long-haul truck drivers and jet-lagged executives.

From 1987 to 1989 he was responsible for the project Ultrashort sleep: a strategy for optimal performance during sustained operations funded by the Canadian Government at the University of Ottawa. in 1990 he started a controlled study at the Institute of Circadian Physiology's research labs in Cambridge, Massachusetts. He divided his test subjects into three groups, who would all sleep only three hours a day. The first group would take all three hours at once, the second would sleep an hour and a half at night and then take three naps during the day, and the last group —the true polyphasic sleepers— would take their sleep in half-hour naps every four hours. After establishing a baseline performance based on eight hours of sleep, he compared the results: after more than a month, the first group showed a loss in performance of 30%, the second 25% and the third only 12%.

He is the editor and contributor of three chapters to Why We Nap: Evolution, Chronobiology, and Functions of Polyphasic and Ultrashort Sleep. The book is considered a reference on the subject and is widely available in academic libraries. Six editions were published between 1992 and 2014 with a foreword by Jürgen Aschoff, the co-founder of the field of chronobiology. He also wrote more than 100 research papers on his work.

== Publications ==
Why We Nap: Evolution, Chronobiology, and Functions of Polyphasic and Ultrashort Sleep. Boston, Basel, Berlin: Birkhauser (1992)
