= National Sleep Foundation =

Industry-funded nonprofit

- Founded: 1990
- Headquarters: Washington, D.C.
- Revenue: 3,564,345 United States dollar (2017, 2018)
- Total assets: 10,973,827 United States dollar (2022)
- Website: www.theNSF.org

The National Sleep Foundation (NSF) is an American non-profit, charitable organization. Founded in 1990, its stated goal is to provide expert information on health-related issues concerning sleep. It is largely funded by pharmaceutical and medical device companies.

== Research ==
=== NSF Sleep Duration Recommendations ===
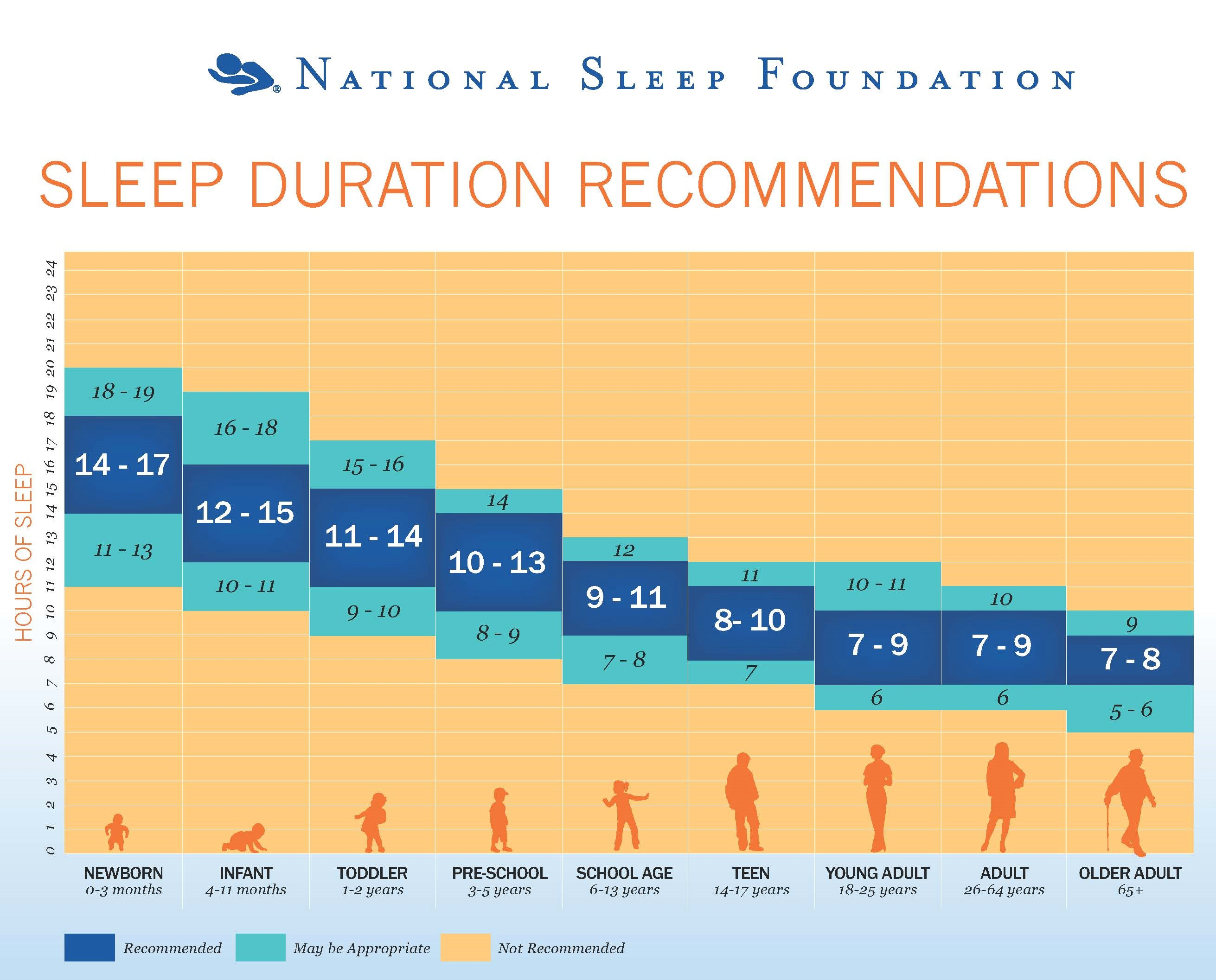
NSF Sleep Duration Recommendations Chart developed based on NSF's research paper

In 2015 NSF released the results of a research study on sleep duration recommendations. The paper titled "National Sleep Foundation's sleep time duration recommendations: methodology and results summary" was published in the peer-reviewed Sleep Health Journal. NSF convened an expert panel of 18 leading scientists and researchers tasked with updating the official sleep duration recommendations. The panelists included sleep specialists and representatives from leading organizations including the American Academy of Pediatrics, American Association of Anatomy, American College of Chest Physicians, American Congress of Obstetricians and Gynecologists, American Geriatrics Society, American Neurological Association, American Physiological Society, American Psychiatric Association, American Thoracic Society, Gerontological Society of America, Human Anatomy and Physiology Society, and Society for Research in Human Development. The panelists participated in a rigorous scientific process that included reviewing over 300 current scientific publications and voting on how much sleep is appropriate throughout the lifespan.

=== Sleep Health Index ===
NSF developed Sleep Health Index to measure sleep health at a global group or at an individual level. It was created with the help of sleep experts and public opinion research experts. It is composed of three sub-component scales: sleep duration, sleep quality, and sleep disorders. The Index is fielded quarterly and results are publicly available.

=== Sleep in America Poll ===
NSF has conducted a national poll called Sleep in America Poll to catalog the state of sleep in America since 1991. This poll provides valuable information to the public, sleep community and the media on specific topics of interest. Past Sleep In America poll data and results are available on the NSF's website.

The NSF Sleep in America poll began providing evidence of the size and scope of the American sleep problem in 1991. The 2002 Sleep in America poll (1,010 people surveyed) first suggested that as many as 47 million Americans were risking injury and health problems because they were not sleeping enough. Media coverage of 2002 Sleep in America poll suggested a sleep "crisis" and an "epidemic," and included headlines such as "Epidemic of daytime sleepiness linked to increased feelings of anger, stress and pessimism." Again, in NSF's 2005 Sleep in America poll, it reported that half of adults report frequent sleep problems and 77 percent reported a partner with a sleep problem, with snoring being the most common complaint.

The Centers for Disease Control (CDC) declared insufficient sleep a "public health epidemic" in 2014.

=== Sleep Health Journal ===
Sleep Health is NSF's official, peer-reviewed academic journal. It was launched in 2015. The Journal's aims are to explore sleep's role in population health and bring the social science perspective on sleep and health. Its scope extends across diverse sleep-related fields, including anthropology, education, health services research, human development, international health, law, mental health, nursing, nutrition, psychology, public health, public policy, fatigue management, transportation, social work, and sociology.

The Journal was 2016 winner of the Association of American Publishers' PROSE Award for Best New Journal in Science, Technology and Medicine. The PROSE Awards annually recognize the very best in professional and scholarly publishing by bringing attention to distinguished books, journals, and electronic content.

The 2021 Journal Citation Reports published a 2020 Impact Factor of 4.450 for Sleep Health.

=== Sleep Monitoring Standards ===
In 2014 NSF encouraged the Consumer Technology Association (CTA) and the American National Standards Institute (ANSI) to develop standards for sleep technology. As a result, the R6.4 WG1 Sleep Monitors Group was established, composed of sleep experts and technology manufacturers. In September 2017, CEA and NSF announced a new standard for measuring sleep cycles with wearables and other applications. The new standard expands on 2016's work that defined terms and functionality required for sleep measuring devices.

== Education ==
=== Public education ===
NSF educates the public about sleep health in content that appears through online, print and broadcast media. NSF's official website is thensf.org which is the primary sleep health website for sleep education content. NSF operates three public education websites: thensf.org, drowsydriving.org (supporting NSF's annual Drowsy Driving Prevention Week campaign), and sleephealthjournal.org (supporting NSF's peer-reviewed research journal Sleep Health). NSF also licenses its educational content at times for distribution by other entities. NSF-branded sleep health content appears on sleepfoundation.org, which was acquired by OneCare Media in 2019. OneCare is a marketing business based on digital content, with a portfolio of consumer-oriented websites, primarily focused on health topics, and derives revenues from commissions on products sold by its affiliate partners. The website continues to be titled "Sleep Foundation" and uses the .org domain.

=== Physician education ===
The National Sleep Foundation is accredited by the Accreditation Council for Continuing Medical Education (ACCME) to provide continuing medical education for physicians. In March 2017, NSF was awarded Accreditation with Commendation by the ACCME. Accreditation with Commendation is ACCME's mechanism for celebrating organizations that excel. Many of NSF's physician education courses are found in the Sleep Learning Zone, an online learning platform.

== Public awareness ==
=== Sleep Awareness Week ===
Sleep Awareness Week is NSF's annual public awareness event celebrating sleep health. It usually occurs during the week leading up to the beginning of daylight-saving time in the spring. During this week, NSF releases the results from its annual Sleep in America Poll or from the Sleep Health Index. NSF provides valuable information about the benefits of optimal sleep and how sleep affects health, well-being, and safety. The week-long campaign provides the public and the media with shareable messages including an infographic, sleep health messaging, and social media posts.

=== Drowsy Driving Prevention Week ===
NSF conducts an annual Drowsy Driving Prevention Week during the week leading up to the end of daylight-saving time in the fall. The campaign goal is to reduce the number of drivers who choose to drive while sleep deprived. Drowsy driving is responsible for more than 6,400 U.S. deaths annually. These fall-asleep crashes are often caused by voluntarily not getting the sleep one needs. Millions of Americans also experience excessive sleepiness as a result of sleep disorders, such as obstructive sleep apnea and narcolepsy. The campaign encompasses dissemination of educational messages via social media.

== Notable awardees ==
Since 2001 NSF has been recognizing and celebrating the achievements of individuals who have contributed to advancing the sleep field. The following individuals received an award from the National Sleep Foundation:

- 2017 - Mark R. Rosekind, Lifetime Achievement
- 2015 - Emmanuel Mignot, Lifetime Achievement
- 2012 - Charmane Eastman, Excellence in Applied Circadian Rhythm Research
- 2012 - Ernest Hartmann, Excellence in Science of Sleep and Dreaming
- 2010 - Wallace B. Mendelson, Sleep & Psychiatry
- 2009 - Colin Sullivan, Sleep Innovator
- 2008 - Charles Czeisler, Lifetime Achievement
- 2005 - Christian Guilleminault, Lifetime Achievement
- 2004 - Allan Rechtschaffen, Lifetime Achievement
- 2001 - William C. Dement, Lifetime Achievement

== SleepTech ==
As part of addressing one of NSF's goals – that sleep science is rapidly incorporated into products and services – NSF launched the SleepTech program to advance innovations in sleep technology. Each year the National Sleep Foundation recognizes innovative sleep products by giving out the SleepTech Awards, the world's first innovation awards targeted specifically at sleep technology. Recent winners are:

- 2020 - SleepTech Award Winner: Itamar Medical - WatchPAT ONE
- 2019 - SleepTech Award Winner: The ReST Bed
- 2019 - SleepTech App Award Winner: Timeshifter - The Jet Lag App
- 2018 - SleepTech Award Winner: Happiest Baby - SNOO Smart Sleeper

== Finances ==
NSF is a 501(c)(3) charitable organization, and contributions are tax-deductible. The foundation's programs are funded by corporate and individual contributions, and through its partnerships with corporations and government entities. Its recent revenues are in the $3.5 million range. According to then-CEO Richard Gelula, "The largest single source of National Sleep Foundation funding is pharmaceutical and medical device companies." In particular, nearly $1 million (≈28%) of its $3.6 million budget at the time came from manufacturers of sleeping medications.

== Controversies ==
The National Sleep Foundation is sometimes criticised on the grounds that its work is unduly influenced by funding from sleeping pill manufacturers. The NSF has been criticized by the American Institute of Philanthropy, Dr. Sidney M. Wolfe of Public Citizen's Health Research Group, Jerry Avorn (head of the Division of Pharmacoepidemiology and Pharmacoeconomics at Harvard Medical School), and other consumer and medical ethics groups for its reliance on industry funding, and the possible influence of such funding on its work.

In 2005, for instance, they released a survey purporting to find extremely high rates of insomnia, declared insomnia to be a "crisis" and an "epidemic," announced an "Insomnia Awareness Day" and a "National Sleep Awareness Week," but the poll, the declaration of a dedicated day and week, and the widely distributed press kits were paid for by manufacturers of sleeping medications, and the public relations firm assigned to contact medical reporters about the poll took the opportunity to mention the shortly-approaching release of Lunesta (eszopiclone), the first sleeping medication approved in the United States for extended use. Simultaneously, the drug's manufacturer assigned 1,250 pharmaceutical sales representatives to educate physicians about Lunesta, as part of a $60 million advertising push. A Sacramento Bee report on these connections also noted that 10 of NSF's 23-member Board of Directors had current or past financial ties to manufacturers of sleeping medications.

These reports led to criticism from Public Citizen's Wolfe, who theorized that "Although they're not saying you should be on a sleeping pill, they're saying go to the doctor and that doctor will sell you a sleeping pill in a large proportion of instances." Wolfe also criticized American doctors for "selling" sleeping pills, "even if it's not what (the patient) really need(s)." A previous 2002 "Sleep in America" poll from NSF, which similarly characterized the results as revealing an "epidemic" of daytime sleepiness in its press release, was similarly characterized in a report by The Seattle Times as industry "astroturfing" due to sponsorship from the makers of the sleeping medications Unisom, Sonata, and Ambien.

A 2016 NSF public education program highlighting "personal stories about sleep for four individuals" received grant support from Merck. A report in the Huffington Post described this effort as part of a multi-pronged "unbranded" marketing effort for Belsomra (suvorexant), Merck's then-forthcoming new sleeping drug.

Some merchants and products have claimed to be "endorsed by the National Sleep Foundation" or have implied such endorsement in their literature. My Pillow made such claims in its television ads. At the time, the NSF was selling MyPillow on its own website. When asked by the Truth in Advertising consumer rights organization, an NSF spokesman declined to say whether MyPillow had made payments to the organization for its claimed “official pillow” status, but said in an email that the organization receives approaches “from many different manufacturers” and “works to select products that are a good fit for our organization.” In 2016, My Pillow agreed to stop claiming an NSF endorsement and paid a fine.
