= Sleep debt =

Cumulative effect of not getting enough sleep

Main health effects of sleep deprivation, indicating impairment of normal maintenance by sleep

Sleep debt or sleep deficit is the cumulative effect of not getting enough sleep. A large sleep debt may lead to mental or physical fatigue, and can adversely affect one's mood, energy, and ability to think clearly.

There are two kinds of sleep debt: the result of partial sleep deprivation, and of total sleep deprivation. Partial sleep deprivation occurs when a person or a lab animal sleeps too little for several days or weeks. Total sleep deprivation, on the other hand, occurs when the subject is kept awake for at least 24 hours. There is debate in the scientific community over the specifics of sleep debt (see § Scientific debate), and it is not considered to be a disorder.

== Physiological effects ==
The effects of chronic sleep debt on the human body's metabolic and endocrine processes are significant, particularly for those individuals who are overweight. An analysis of the physiological impacts of sleep debt, published in The Lancet, investigated the physiological effects of sleep debt by assessing the sympathovagal balance (an indicator of the sympathetic nervous system activity), thyrotropic function, HPA axis activity, as well as the carbohydrate metabolism of 11 young adult males whose sleep period for six nights was either restricted to four hours per night or extended to 12 hours in bed per night. Results revealed that in the sleep-debt condition, thyrotropin concentrations were decreased, while lowered glucose and insulin responses indicated a clear impairment of carbohydrate tolerance, a 30% decrease than in the well-rested sleep condition. Males who were sleep-restricted also showed significantly elevated concentrations of evening cortisol (the "stress" hormone) and elevated sympathetic nervous system activity in comparison to those who enjoyed a full sleep, throughout 6 nights. Losing so much sleep could lead to many chronic health problems that could include: heart disease, kidney disease, hypertension, diabetes, stroke, obesity, depression and neurodegeneration. As stated by the National Institutes of Health, chronic sleep debt has a detrimental impact on human neurophysiological functioning and can disrupt immune, endocrine, and metabolic function, while increasing the severity of cardiovascular and age-related illnesses over a period of time.

== Neuropsychological effects on emotions ==
Accumulated and continuous short-term sleep deficit has been shown to increase and intensify psychophysiological reactions in humans to emotional stimuli. The amygdala plays a strong functional role in the expression of negative emotions such as fear, and, through its anatomical connections with the medial prefrontal cortex (mPFC), has an important function in the subjective suppression of and the reframing and reappraisal of negative emotions. A study assessing sleep deficit in young Japanese men over a 5-day period (during which they slept only 4 hours per day) showed that there was greater left amygdala activation to fearful faces but not happy faces, and an overall subjective mood deterioration. As a result, even short-term continuous sleep debt, or deprivation, has been shown to reduce this functional relationship between the amygdala and mPFC, inducing negative mood changes through increased fear and anxiety to unpleasant emotional stimuli and events. Thus, a full and uninterrupted sleep is crucial for the proper functioning of the amygdala in modulating an individual's mood states—by reducing negative emotional intensities and increasing reactivity to positive emotional stimuli.

== Sleep debt and obesity ==
Epidemiological research has solidified the association between sleep debt or deprivation and obesity as a result of an elevated body mass index (BMI) through various ways, such as disruptions in the hormones leptin and ghrelin that regulate appetite, higher food consumption and poor diets, and a decrease in overall calorie burning. However, in recent years, multimedia usages such as Internet and television consumption that play an active role in sleep deficit have also been linked to obesity by provoking unhealthy, sedentary lifestyles and habits, as well as higher food consumption. Moreover, work-related behaviors such as long working and commuting hours and irregular work timings such as during shift work also function as contributing factors to being overweight or obese as a result of shorter sleeping periods. In comparison to adults, children exhibit a more consistent association between sleep debt and obesity.

== Sleep debt and mortality ==
Several studies have shown that sleep duration, specifically sleep deficit or shorter sleep duration, predicts mortality, whether it be on weekdays or weekends. In people aged 65 years and younger, daily sleep duration of 5 hours or less (amounting to a sleep deficit of 2 hours per day) during weekends correlated with a 52% higher mortality rate—as compared to a control group who slept for 7 hours. Consistent weekday sleep debt exhibited a detrimental association with mortality and morbidity, but this effect was negated when compensated with long sleep during weekends. However, the harmful consequences of sleep debt over weekdays and weekends were not seen in individuals aged 65 years and older.

== Scientific debate ==
There is debate among researchers as to whether the concept of sleep debt describes a measurable phenomenon. The September 2004 issue of the journal Sleep contains dueling editorials from two leading sleep researchers, David F. Dinges and Jim Horne. A 1997 experiment conducted by psychiatrists at the University of Pennsylvania School of Medicine suggested that cumulative nocturnal sleep debt affects daytime sleepiness, particularly on the first, second, sixth, and seventh days of sleep restriction.

In one study, subjects were tested using the psychomotor vigilance task (PVT). Different groups of people were tested with different sleep times for two weeks: 8 hours, 6 hours, 4 hours, and total sleep deprivation. Each day, they were tested for the number of lapses on the PVT. The results showed that, as time went by, each group's performance worsened, with no sign of any stopping point. Moderate sleep deprivation was found to be detrimental; people who slept 6 hours a night for 10 days had similar results to those who were completely sleep deprived for 1 day.

== Evaluation ==
Sleep debt has been tested in a number of studies through the use of a sleep onset latency test. This test attempts to measure how easily a person can fall asleep. When this test is done several times during the day, it is called a multiple sleep latency test (MSLT). The subject is told to go to sleep and is awakened after determining the amount of time it took to fall asleep. The Epworth Sleepiness Scale (ESS), an eight-item questionnaire with scores ranging from 0 to 24, is another tool used to screen for potential sleep debt.

A January 2007 study from Washington University in St. Louis suggests that saliva tests of the enzyme amylase could be used to indicate sleep debt, as the enzyme increases its activity in correlation with the length of time a subject has been deprived of sleep.

The control of wakefulness has been found to be strongly influenced by the protein orexin. A 2009 study from Washington University in St. Louis has illuminated important connections between sleep debt, orexin, and amyloid beta, with the suggestion that the development of Alzheimer's disease could hypothetically be a result of chronic sleep debt or excessive periods of wakefulness.

== Phosphorylation of proteins ==
In mice, there are 80 proteins in the brain, called "sleep need index phosphoproteins" (SNIPPs), which become more and more phosphorylated during waking hours, and are dephosphorylated during sleep. The phosphorylation is aided by the gene Sik3. A type of laboratory mouse (named Sleepy) possesses an altered version of this protein, which is called SLEEPY, where the protein is more active than the regular version. This results in the mice showing more slow-wave sleep activity during non-REM sleep—a reliable indicator that more sleep is met. Inhibition of the Sik3 gene decreases phosphorylation and slow-wave activity in both normal and modified mice.

== See also ==
- Excessive daytime sleepiness – Symptom characterized by persistent sleepiness
- Hypersomnia – Neurological disorder of excessive time spent sleeping or excessive sleepiness
- Insomnia – Disorder causing trouble with sleeping
