= Sleep Research Society =

- Abbreviation: SRS
- Formation: 1961
- Type: Professional association
- Headquarters: Darien, Illinois
- Location: United States
- Members: >1200
- Official language: English
- President: Chiara Cirelli, MD, PhD
- Website: sleepresearchsociety.org

The Sleep Research Society (SRS) is a professional organization dedicated to advancing scientific investigation into sleep and circadian rhythms. The SRS fosters research, research training, and supports an array of professional development programs, webinars, conferences, and advocacy. The society promotes public health and safety by highlighting the application of scientific advances to real-world medical and national policy solutions. Members includes researchers, clinicians, and students worldwide pursuing advances in sleep and circadian sciences, sleep disorder treatments, and optimizing health and well-being.

== Organization ==
The organization traces its roots to a meeting in 1961 of sleep researchers in Chicago, IL. The group adopted an official name, the Association for the Psychophysiological Study of Sleep (APSS), in 1964. The name was changed to the Sleep Research Society (SRS) in 1982. The acronym APSS is still in use today to refer to the Associated Professional Sleep Societies, which is a partnership between the SRS and the American Academy of Sleep Medicine (AASM). The society currently has over 1,200 members who are members of one of four sections: Basic Sleep, Circadian Rhythms, Sleep and Behavior, and Sleep Disorders. Leadership of the society is provided by an elected 12-member board of directors and standing committees. In order to foster programmatic continuity and momentum, the terms of SRS presidents was changed from one to two years in 2014.

The SRS participates in the World Sleep Society and currently holds a seat on its Governing Council.

The SRS is also a founding member of the Coalition for Permanent Standard Time (CpST).

== Foundation ==
The Sleep Research Society Foundation (SRSF) was founded in 2005. Foundation awards grants supporting Career Development, Small Research, and Mentored Collaborations. Scholarships are offered to help SRS trainee members travel to the annual SRS meetings and attend workshops on career development and grantsmanship. The First Time Attendee program helps non-member trainees attend the annual SLEEP meeting by covering membership and registration.

== Publications ==
The Journal SLEEP is a monthly peer reviewed journal, the official publication of the SRS, and the benchmark international journal for sleep and circadian science. The Editor-in-Chief is Allan I. Pack, MD. In 2020, SRS launched SLEEP Advances, a Gold Open Access companion journal to SLEEP in partnership with the Australasian Sleep Association. It includes high-quality and replicable basic, translational, and clinical research in sleep and circadian science.

The SRS launched a series of podcasts in 2022 organized and moderated by Jesse Cook, PhD from the University of Wisconsin. In 2026, Casandra Nyhuis, PhD from Johns Hopkins Bloomberg School of Public Health is hosting the podcast. The series is designed to highlight research advances, career opportunities, other sleep research developments.

State of the science white papers, position statements, and recommendations from the SRS on selected topics such as the use of wearable technology in research and adopting permanent standard time are published in the journal SLEEP.

The SRS textbook, Fundamentals of Sleep and Circadian Science, includes chapters contributed by dozens of society members highlighting the current understanding of sleep, circadian biology, and their significance to health and society. First published in 2005, the latest edition was published in 2025 and edited by Chiara Cirelli, PhD.

SRS also offers informative, bilingual articles on topics of broad public interest such as Late Night Technology & Sleep, Family Caregivers, Sleep & Health, Common Sleep Myths, and How Sleep Loss Affects Alertness and Performance.

== Meetings ==
The SLEEP annual meeting of the Associated Professional Sleep Societies (APSS) is a yearly scientific meeting held in partnership between SRS and AASM. This event aims to bring together scientists, physicians and other clinical staff in order to bring new developments to patients. Approximately 5,000 people attend each year to hear presentations on the latest research. It is the largest meeting in the United States solely devoted to sleep, circadian rhythms and sleep medicine and is composed of scientific sessions, poster presentations, and an exhibition hall. Abstracts for presentations are published in a supplemental issue of the journal SLEEP.

An array of Career Advancement activities are hosted by the SRS Trainee Education Advisory Committee (TEAC) in conjunction with the annual SLEEP meeting. A networking development suite is open to all trainees during the SLEEP meeting facilitating meetings with mentors and daily career development presentations.

Advances in Sleep & Circadian Science (ASCS) is a biennial, single-track, SRS meeting designed to encourage in-depth discussion and networking. The next meeting is February, 2027, in Austin, Texas.

In partnership with the American Academy of Sleep Medicine (AASM) and the NIH National Center on Sleep Disorders Research, SRS organizes Sleep101. This half-day, annual symposium is designed to highlight sleep research opportunities and is available to the public online. A recording of the 2025 symposium is available through the SRS website.
