= Sleep (journal) =

- Discipline: Sleep
- Language: English
- Edited by: Allan I. Pack

Publication details
- History: 1978-present
- Publisher: Oxford University Press
- Frequency: Monthly
- Open access: Delayed, after 6 months
- Impact factor: 5.3 (2023)

Standard abbreviations
- ISO 4: Sleep

Indexing
- CODEN: SLEED6
- ISSN: 0161-8105 (print); 1550-9109 (web)
- LCCN: 79642696
- OCLC no.: 643580903

Links
- Journal homepage; Online access; Online archive

Sleep is a monthly peer-reviewed medical journal covering research on sleep. Topics include basic and neuroscience studies of sleep, in vitro and animal models of sleep, studies in clinical or population samples, clinical trials, and epidemiologic studies. It is the official journal of the Sleep Research Society. The journal was established in 1978 and the editor-in-chief is Allan I. Pack (University of Pennsylvania).

== Abstracting and indexing ==
The journal is abstracted and indexed in:

- Science Citation Index
- Current Contents/Clinical Medicine
- Current Contents/Life Sciences
- BIOSIS Previews
- Index Medicus/MEDLINE/PubMed

According to the Journal Citation Reports, the journal has a 2023 impact factor of 5.3.
