= American Academy of Sleep Medicine =

Professional society

- Abbreviation: AASM
- Formation: 1975; 51 years ago
- Type: Professional Association
- Headquarters: Darien, IL
- Location: United States
- Members: 11,000
- Official language: English
- President: Fariha Abbasi-Feinberg, MD
- Website: aasm.org
- Formerly called: American Sleep Disorders Association

The American Academy of Sleep Medicine (AASM) is a United States professional society for the medical subspecialty of sleep medicine, which focuses on the prevention, diagnosis, and treatment of sleep disorders and disorders of circadian rhythms. It was established in 1975.

The organization's functions include the accreditation of sleep medicine facilities in the United States. According to the AASM, the organization issued its first accreditation to a sleep disorders center in 1977 (April 27, Sleep-Wake Disorders Center, Montefiore Medical Center, New York), and by 2024 had accredited more than 2,300 sleep facilities across the U.S., Canada, and U.S. territories.

== Membership ==
Membership is open to U.S. and international physicians, researchers, advanced practice providers, dentists, psychologists, respiratory therapists, sleep technologists and other health care professionals who are involved in the study, diagnosis and treatment of disorders of sleep and daytime alertness.

== Publications ==
The AASM publishes the International Classification of Sleep Disorders, which serves as a guide to clinicians in the identification of specific sleep disorders. The current edition is the third edition, text revision (ICSD-3-TR) that was published in 2023. The AASM also publishes The AASM Manual for the Scoring of Sleep and Associated Events: Rules, Terminology and Technical Specifications, the definitive reference for the evaluation of polysomnography (PSG) and a home sleep apnea test (HSAT). This resource provides rules for scoring sleep stages, arousals, respiratory events during sleep, movements during sleep and cardiac events. It also provides standard montages, electrode placements and digitization parameters. The current version 3 was released in 2023.

The latest findings in sleep medicine are published in the Journal of Clinical Sleep Medicine, the official peer-reviewed journal of the AASM. JCSM includes original clinical research, clinical reviews, case studies and opinion pieces from prominent sleep researchers on circadian rhythms and sleep science.

The AASM also publishes clinical practice guidelines, position statements, and consensus papers to provide recommendations to clinicians for the evaluation, diagnosis, treatment and follow-up of sleep and circadian rhythm sleep-wake disorders. The clinical practice guidelines are developed by a task force of experts who perform a systematic review of all published evidence on the topic. The evidence is then assessed using The Grading of Recommendations Assessment, Development and Evaluation (GRADE) approach.

== Annual meeting ==
The SLEEP annual meeting of the Associated Professional Sleep Societies LLC (APSS) is a joint venture of the AASM and the Sleep Research Society. The meeting attracts about 5,000 attendees each year. Research abstracts from each SLEEP meeting are published annually in a supplement of Sleep, the peer-reviewed publication of the SRS. SLEEP 2026, the 40th annual meeting of the APSS, was held in June in Baltimore, Maryland.

== Foundation ==
Founded in 1998, the American Academy of Sleep Medicine Foundation is a not-for-profit 501(c)(3) charitable and scientific organization that was established by the AASM. Formerly the American Sleep Medicine Foundation (ASMF), the AASM Foundation has invested in the future of sleep medicine by supporting more than 400 grants and awards totaling over $34 million in funding. Its portfolio includes Strategic Research Grants and Career Development Grants.

== Notable people ==
- William C. Dement, sleep medicine and sleep research pioneer who was the founding president of the American Academy of Sleep Medicine.
- Qanta Ahmed, British-American physician specializing in sleep disorders, and author, women's rights activist, journalist, and public commentator.
