= Sleep pod =

Structure in which to nap

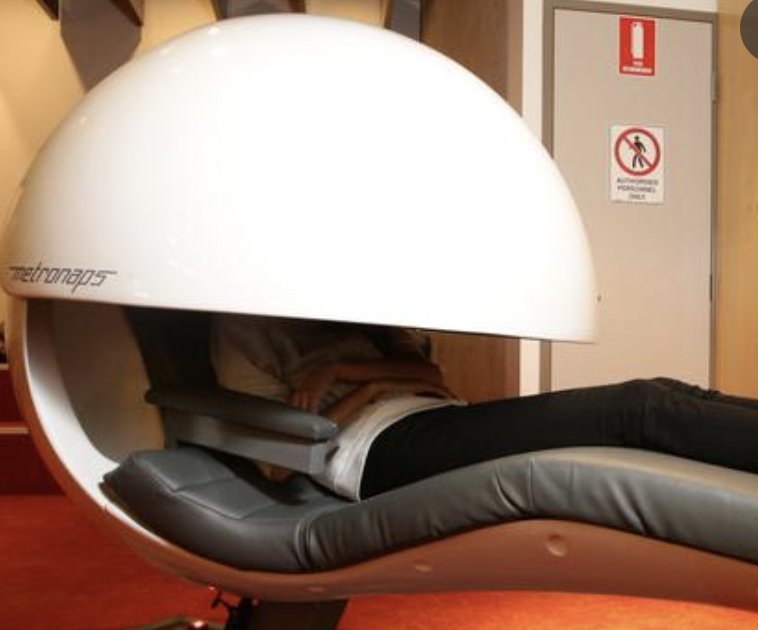
A person resting in a sleep pod at a university

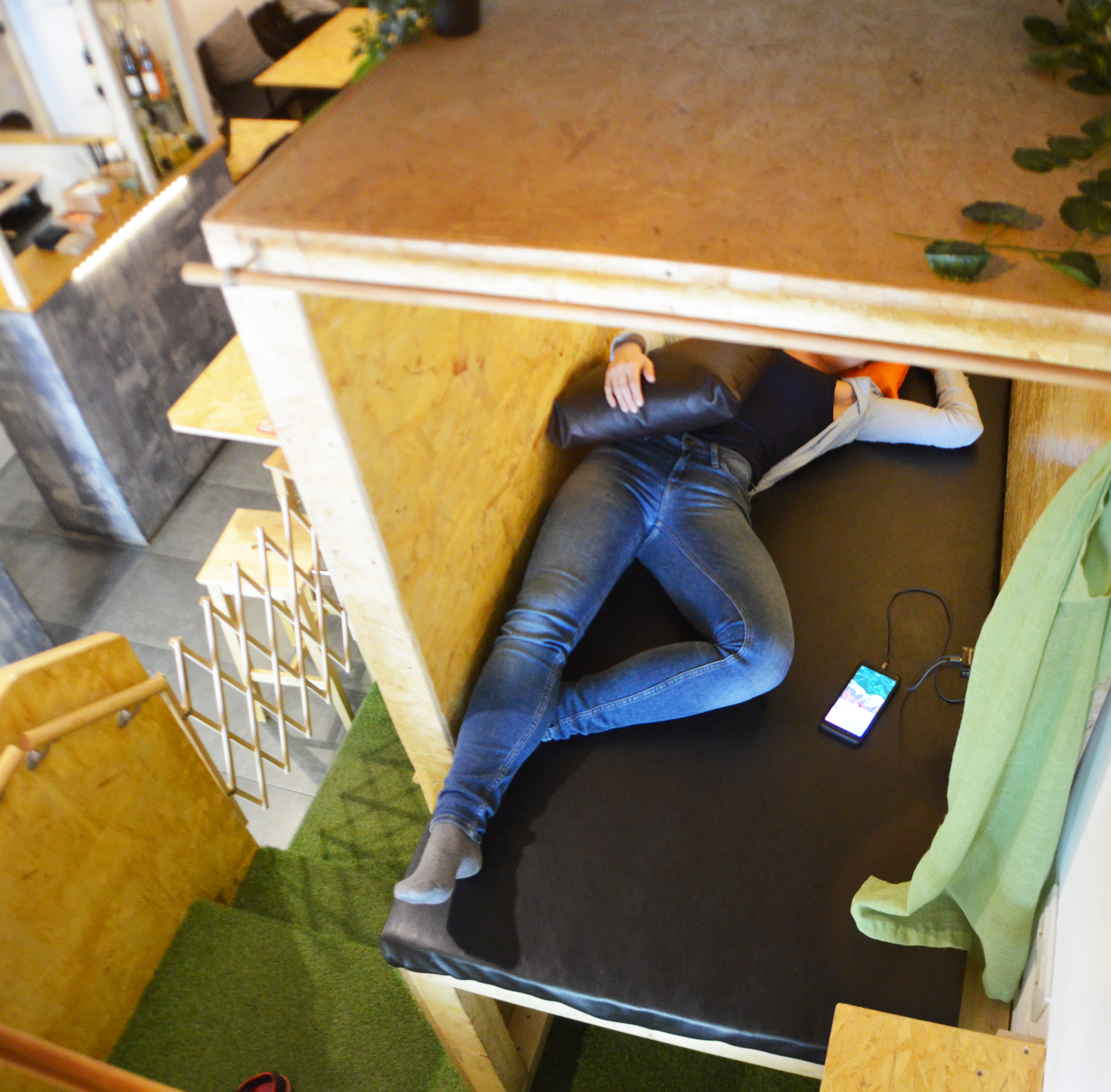
A woman resting in a napping pod, in the "Nappuccino" café in Barcelona, Spain

A sleep pod, also known as nap pod, napping pod, or nap capsule, is a special type of structure or chair that humans can nap and sleep on. Users use the pods to take private sleep breaks, often aided by technology and ambient features. Nap pods have emerged in corporate environments, hospitals, universities, airports and other public places. Their supposed efficacy is rooted in research that suggests that 20-minute naps could reduce signs of fatigue, boost energy levels, improve focus, boost productivity, improve mood, enhance learning, reduce stress and reduce the risk of cardiovascular disease.

== Origins ==
Technological development of nap pods emerges from growing awareness of the health benefits of sleep and napping, which include productivity and cognitive function. The original sleep pod was designed by Kisho Kurokawa in 1979, in his design for the Capsule Inn Osaka.

== Workplace sleep culture ==
Existing products and designs are being used particularly for professionals and commuters. By devising specialised furniture that encourages short, structured naps during the day, specialists like Dr James B Mass, who coined the term ‘power nap’, writes of his intention to alter existing workplace culture in the West to improve focus and energy. This aligns with cultural practices such as Siesta in Spain, a mid afternoon break where work and activity is halted. The Japanese practice of Inemuri, sleeping at work, is culturally viewed as proof of dedication to the point of exhaustion, and has also influenced the use of nap pods around the world.

Push for a workplace cultural shift that emphasises the necessity of sleep and rest has been heralded by Arianna Huffington. Her book The Sleep Revolution includes rhetoric that encourages normalisation for the need for rest in high stress work environments, and was followed by the launch of Thrive Global, an origination which provides wellness training to corporations including advice to encourage employees taking appropriate sleep breaks when needed. Huffington writes "That idea that sleep is somehow a sign of weakness and that burnout and sleep deprivation are macho signs of strength is particularly destructive, So changing the way we talk about sleep is an important part of the culture shift."

Other leading scientists encouraging a revision of existing cultural understandings of exhaustion include Matthew Walker, neuroscientist and author of Why We Sleep: The New Science of Sleep and Dreams, who labeled humanity as in “the midst of a global sleep loss pandemic”. He has publicly endorsed nap pods in offices “even if they just signal some degree of recognition of sleep’s importance in the workplace by people in senior positions.”

Sleep specialist and psychiatrist Rita Aoud told The Guardian, in light of existing data that “Research shows that a nap of about 20 minutes in the afternoon has a positive effect on attention, vigilance, mood and alertness.

The actions of major corporations in establishing nap pod technology in their workplaces indicates that research and expert advice on the importance of sleep and the effectiveness of day time napping is influencing company culture.

Workplaces have been criticised for installing nap pods. Diana Bradley commented in one article that in offering technology such as these as perks for employees, companies can ignore more fundamental support in the form of management and policy.

== References in science fiction ==
Nap pods are a prevalent technology in science fiction books, movies and television, often fitted with futuristic sleep technology.

Cryosleep pods, which hold bodies frozen in suspended animation appear in the films Alien, Avatar, 2001: a Space Odyssey, Passengers, and Event Horizon. In these instances compact bed ‘pods’ similar in construction to existing nap-pod designs are depicted, storing sleeping bodies during long term space travel.

The sleep pods in the 1979 film Alien are white capsules in clusters of eight, with glass shields across the top. The crew members inside are in suspended animation, unconscious until ‘activated’, un-aged and able to join the workforce. Suspended animation in pods is also seen in the space adventure TV series Lost in Space, Star Trek, and Futurama. In a 2015 Doctor Who episode, Sleep No More, the scientists and crew of a space lab forgo normal sleep patterns by using ‘Morpheus’ sleep pods, that can compress months of sleep into a two minute nap. Confined within the pods, a human’s brain activity is altered to maximise the productivity on board a ship.

== Notable locations ==
Nap pod technology has been implemented and installed in a number of notable public and private spaces.

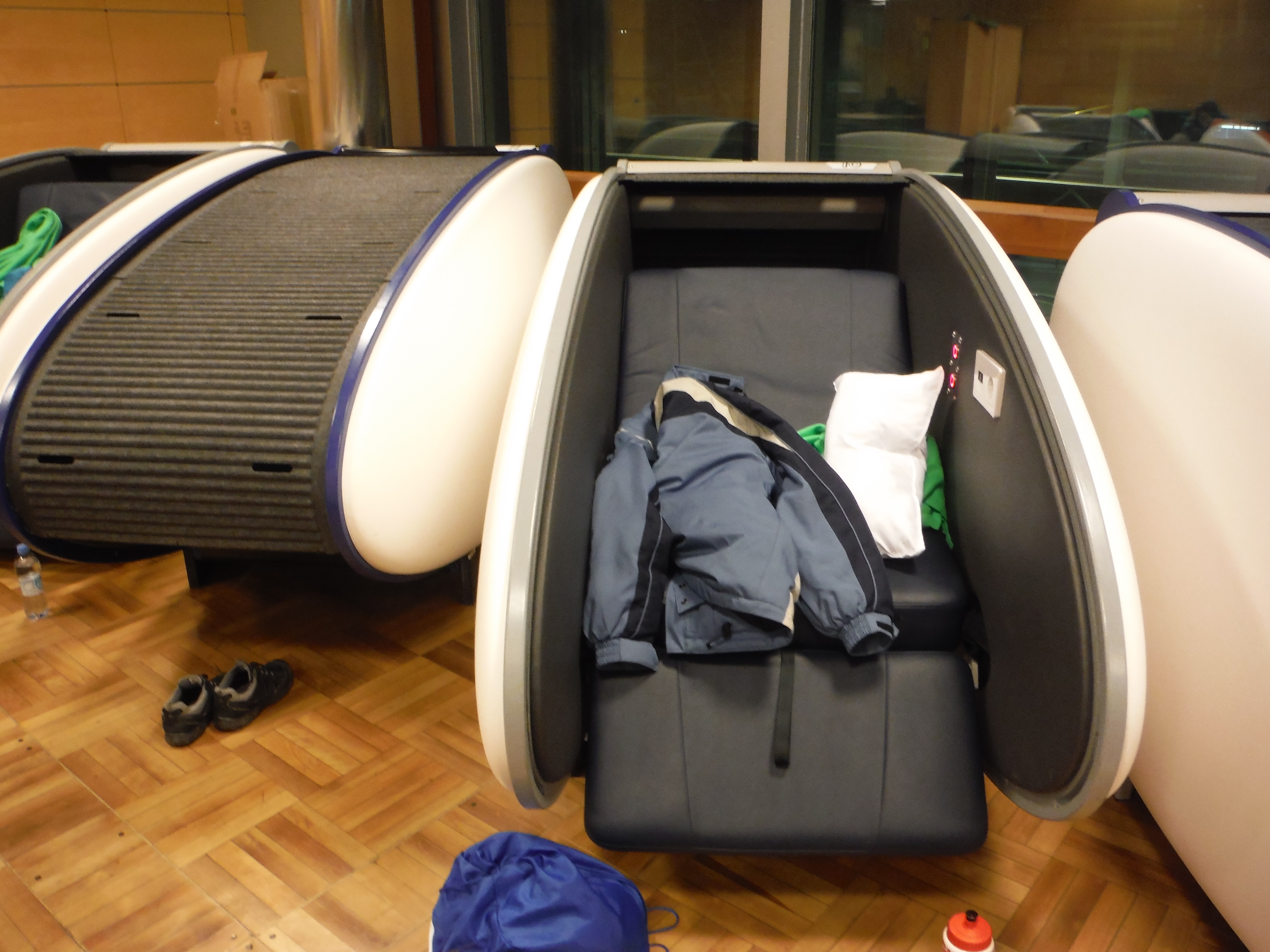
Sleeping pods at Helsinki Airport

They are available at airports for travellers to use between and before flights at JFK airport, Atlanta Airport, Berlin Airport, Munich Airport, Dubai Airport, and Istanbul Airport.

Tech companies Google, Samsung and Facebook have installed nap pods across their headquarters and offices for employee use. Nike's headquarters in Portland, Oregon, has rooms on site in which employees can sleep or meditate. Ben & Jerry's has had a nap room at its headquarters since 2010.

Universities including King's College London, Sydney University, Western Sydney University, The University of Miami, Wesleyan University, Stanford University and Washington State University have nap pods in campus libraries and student centers.

The Sydney Swans AFL team installed two 'sleep chambers' for players to use between training and game sessions at the SCG Stadium.

In the UK, the NHS has installed sleep pods in public hospitals for doctors, nurses and staff.
