= Nap (disambiguation) =

A nap is a short period of sleep.

Nap or NAP may also refer to:

== People ==
- Henry Botterell (1896–2003), Canadian World War I fighter pilot nicknamed "Nap"
- Nap Kloza (1903–1962), American baseball player and manager
- Nap Lajoie (1874–1959), American Hall-of-Fame Major League Baseball player
- Nap Milroy (1922–2012), Canadian ice hockey player
- James Napoli (1911–1992), New York mobster nicknamed "Jimmy Nap"
- Nap Reyes (1919–1995), Cuban-born Major League Baseball player
- Nap Rucker (1884–1970), American Major League Baseball pitcher

== Sports and games ==
- Cleveland Naps, former name of Cleveland Guardians baseball team
- Napoleon (card game) or Nap, a popular card game
- Nap, a tipster's "racing certainty"

== Other uses ==
- Nap (fabric), the raised surface of velvet, etc.
- "The Nap", an episode of TV sitcom Seinfeld
- Nap TV, a Hungarian television production company

== NAP ==
=== Codes ===
- Naples International Airport, IATA code NAP
- Neapolitan language, ISO 639-2/3 code nap, spoken in southern Italy
- Narragansett Pier Railroad, reporting mark NAP

=== Politics and government ===
- National Action Party (disambiguation)
- National action plan (disambiguation)
- National Action Plan on the Elimination of Child Labour
- National Adaptation Programme, required by the UK 2008 Climate Change Act
- National Alliance Party (disambiguation)
- National Alliance Party (Papua New Guinea), formed in 1995
- National Allocation Plan, part of the European Union Emission Trading Scheme
- National Archives of Pakistan
- National Action Plan (Pakistan), to combat terrorism
- National Awami Party, Pakistan, 1957-early 1970s
- Network Against Prohibition, Australian drug law reform group
- New Alliance Party, US, 1979–1993
- Non-aggression principle, a tenet of libertarian politics
- Non-aggression pact
- Noninsured Assistance Program, a US program for farmers
- North Australia Party
- Nutrition Assistance for Puerto Rico

=== Science, technology, and medicine ===
- Network access point, a public facility for connection between ISPs
- Network Access Protection, a computer security technology
- Nautical Archaeology Program of Texas A&M University
- Amsterdam Ordnance Datum (Normaal Amsterdams Peil), a geodetic datum
- Naphthylaminopropane, a monoamine-releasing drug

=== Other ===
- Neuilly-Auteuil-Passy, a posh area of Paris and neighbouring Neuilly-sur-Seine, France
- Nagaland Armed Police, India
- National Academies Press, a science publisher
- National Association of Parliamentarians
- Naval Aviation Pilot, an enlisted U.S. Navy and U.S. Marine Corps pilot (until 1981)
- Nebraska AIDS Project
- New African Poets, a French hip hop group
- Non-aggression Pact (band), an American urban-electro-industrial music group, abbreviated as N.A.P.
- North American Pairs, an annual contract bridge competition
- North AmeriCare Park, a former name of Sahlen Field, is a baseball park in Buffalo, New York
- Noyautage des administrations publiques, an arm of the French Resistance

== See also ==
- Gnap (disambiguation)
- Knap
- Nape (disambiguation)
- Napp (disambiguation)
- Nappe (disambiguation)
- Naps (disambiguation)
