= Gnap =

Gnap may refer to:

- Gnap!, the word used by Smurfs after being turned into The Black Smurfs
- Greg Norman Australian Prime, a meat export venture between Greg Norman and Australian Agricultural Company
- Dmytro Gnap (born 1977), Ukrainian journalist
- Markus Gnap, drummer of Disbelief
- The player character in the video game U.F.O.s

== See also ==
- Nap (disambiguation)
- Napp (disambiguation)
- Nappe (disambiguation)
