= Siesta =

Short nap taken in the early afternoon

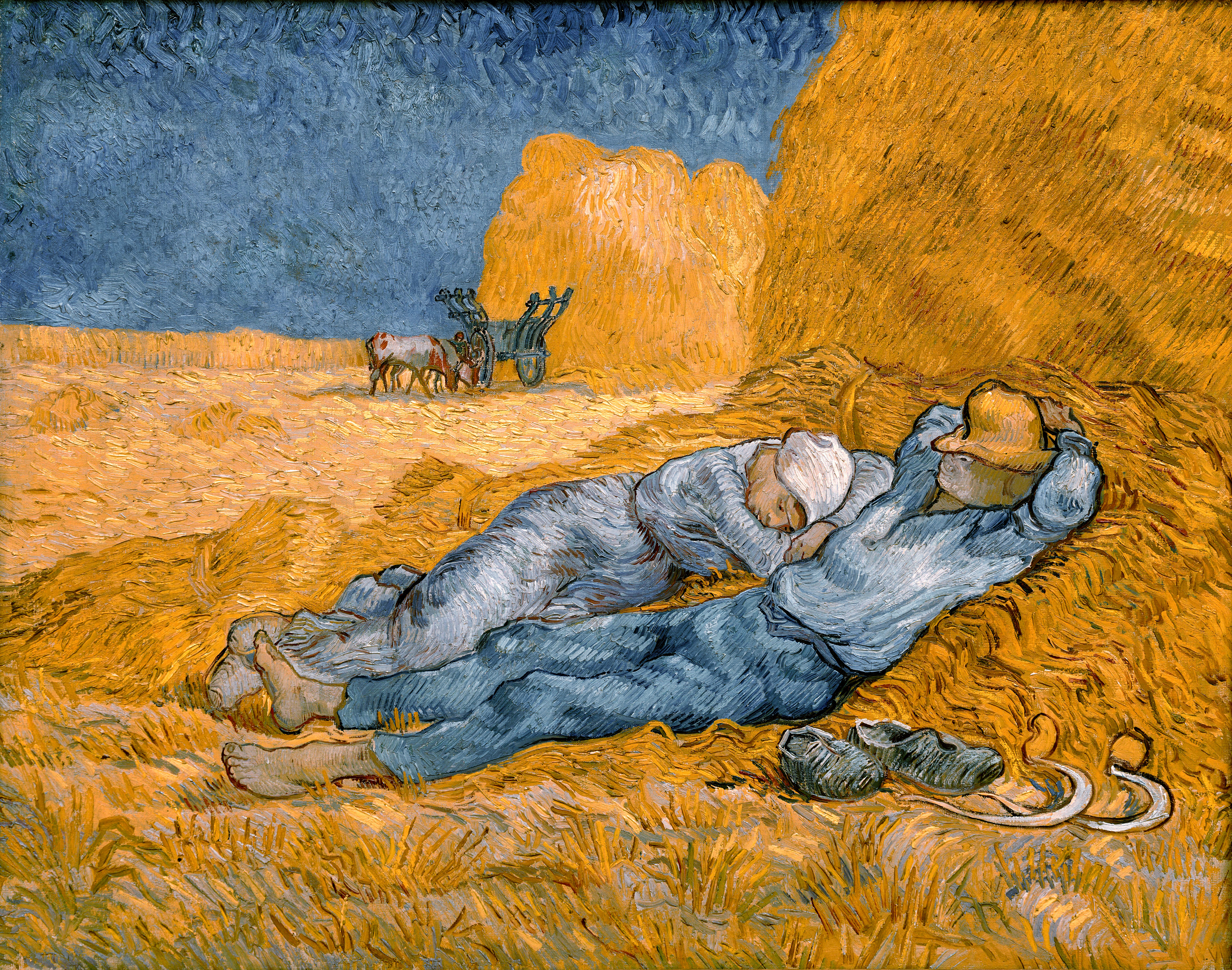
A painting of two farmers having a siesta (The siesta by Vincent van Gogh, 1890)

A midday nap is a short nap taken in the early afternoon, often after the midday meal. It is frequently referred to by its Spanish name siesta (pronounced [ˈsjesta]).

According to some historians, the midday nap was common in the American south, although only reserved to masters. It is still a widespread tradition in many countries, particularly those in warm-weather zones: the Mediterranean, Southern Europe (it. pisolino pomeridiano "little afternoon nap", gr. μεσημβρινός ύπνος "afternoon sleep"), South and Southeast Asia and mainland China (午睡, wǔshuì); in the Middle East and more generally in Muslim countries, the قيلولة (qailulah) is recommended by the prophet Mohammed. Through Spanish influence, midday naps are also common in most of Latin America and the Philippines.

English-language media often conflates the midday nap with the two- to three-hour lunch break that is characteristic of Spanish and Portuguese working hours.

Long considered a sign of "laziness" in the English-speaking world, the midday nap is currently being revitalised in the United States, the United Kingdom, and other countries, with the term power nap. This comes with a workplace cultural shift that emphasises the necessity of sleep and rest.

== Etymology ==
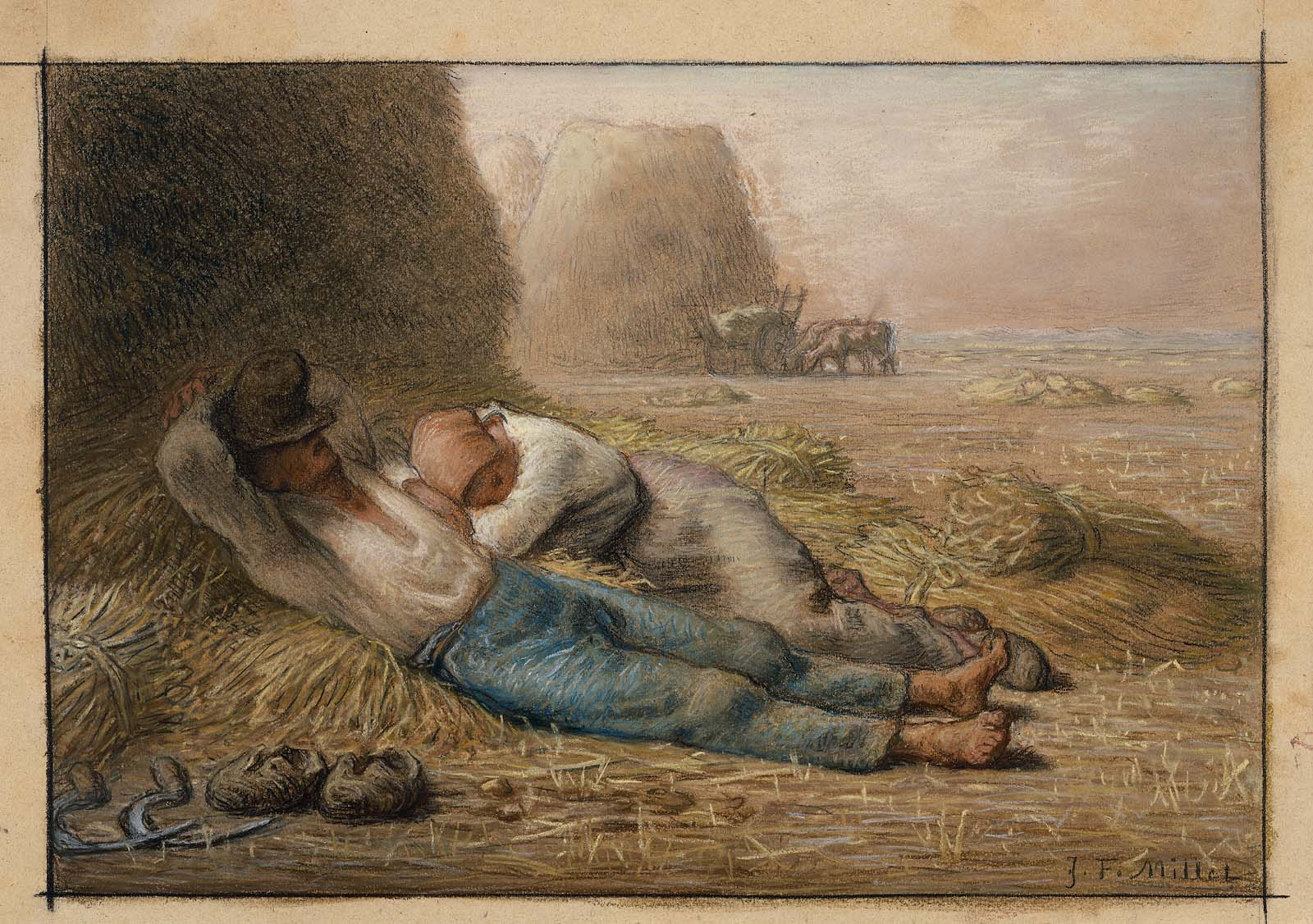
La méridienne ("Siesta") A painting of two farmers having a siesta, Jean-François Millet (1866)

The Spanish word siesta is originally derived from the Latin phrase [hora] sexta ('sixth [hour]', counting from dawn, hence "midday rest"), which puts it around noon time.

The latin language itself used the word merīdiātiō which made reference to merīdiēs "midday". This word remains in French méridienne.

== History ==
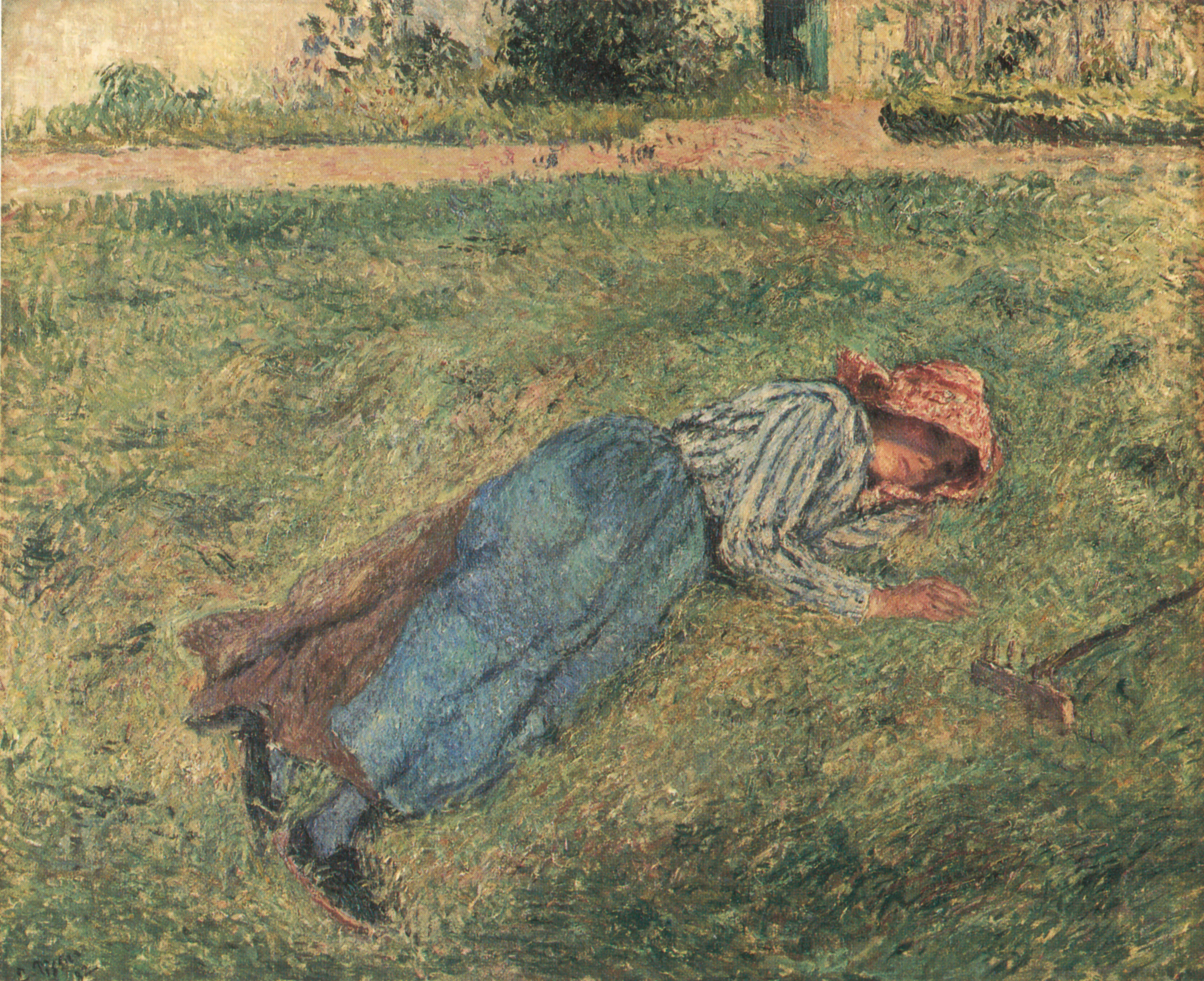
Le repos ("Rest") A painting of a female farmer sleeping at noon, by Camille Pissarro (1882)

The custom of taking a midday nap or merīdiātiō at the sixth hour evolved in Roman times along the Mediterranean coastline. As Roman nobles serving in that area found it difficult to handle the heat at noon time, they used to take this nap.

The custom is mentioned among others by classical authors such as Catullus, Caesar,, Cicero, Suetonius,

It is also mentioned later in the letters of Sidonius regarding the habits of Theodoric II, King of the Goths (5th century): "The siesta [merīdiātiō] after dinner is always slight, and sometimes intermitted".

Einhard's Life of Charlemagne describes the emperor's summertime midday naps: "In summer, after his midday meal, he would eat some fruit and take another drink; then he would remove his shoes and undress completely, just as he did at night, and rest for two or three hours."

== By country ==
=== North America ===
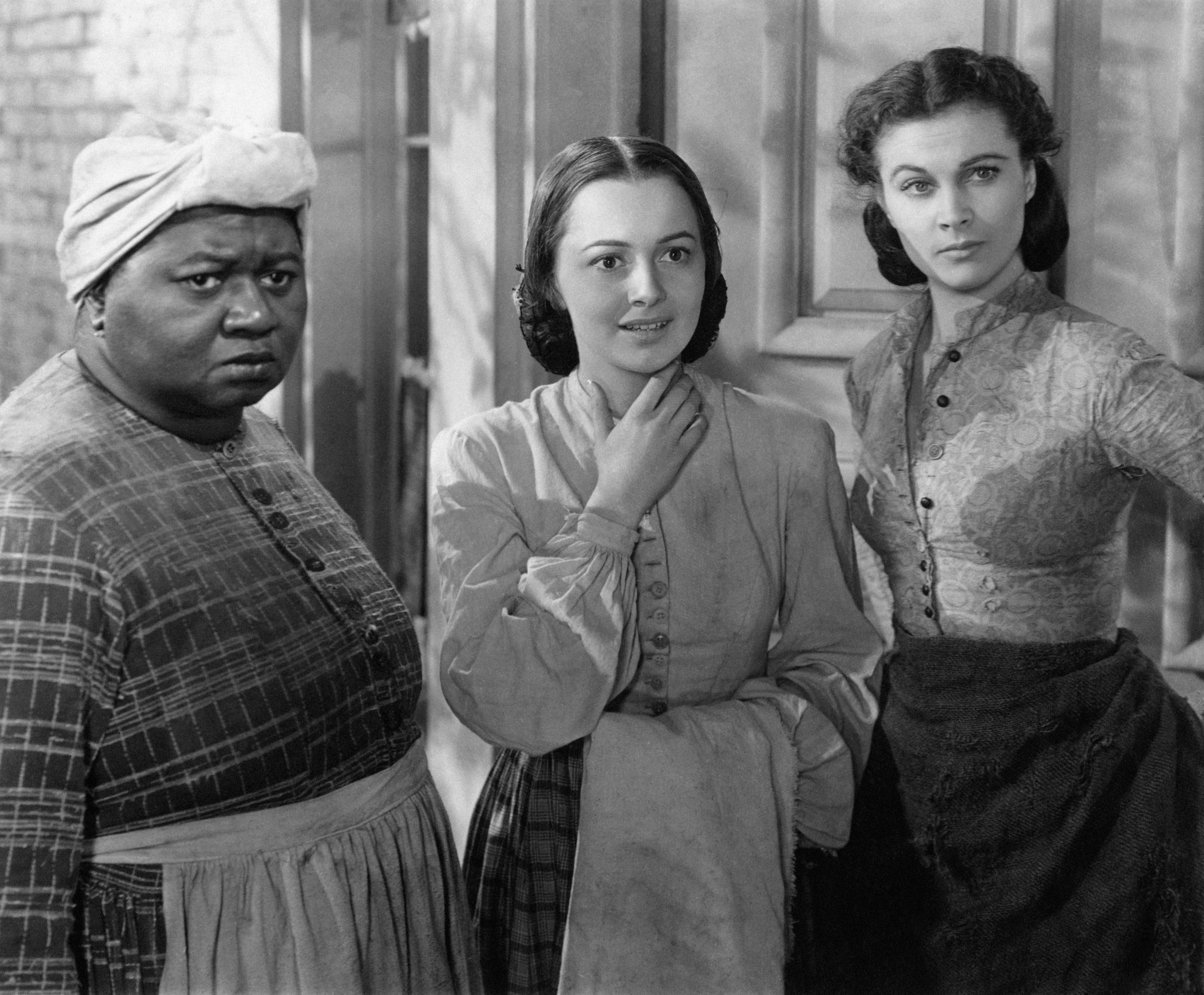
The book and the film Gone with the Wind depicts midday naps in 19th century American South as reserved only to masters, while slaves were not allowed to rest. This representation is consistent with historical research.

Some historians point out that midday naps were a common habit in 19th century American South. However, this was very probably limited to the élite social class, such as slave owners, while slaves were not allowed to rest. This custom is also depicted in the book and the film Gone with the Wind (1939):

Scarlett - Why do I have to take a nap? I'm not tired.
Mammy - Well-brought-up young ladies take naps at parties. And it's high time you started behavin' and actin' like you was Miss Ellen's daughter.
Scarlett - When we were at Saratoga I didn't notice any Yankee girls taking naps.
Mammy - No, and you ain't gonna see no Yankee girls at the ball tonight neither.

— Gone with the wind

=== South America ===
In South America, the siesta time is common also in colder regions such as Patagonia.

=== Europe ===
==== Spain ====
As for the origins of the practice in Spain, the scorching summer heat predominant mostly in the South is thought to have motivated those doing agrarian work to take a break to avoid the hottest part of the day and be able to work longer hours when it is cooler. In cities, the economic situation in Spain and during the post-Spanish Civil War years was dismal. At that time, a long midday break—with or without a siesta—was necessary for those commuting between the part-time jobs, which were common in the sputtering economy. This situation was soon followed by the advent of a modern economy and urbanization.

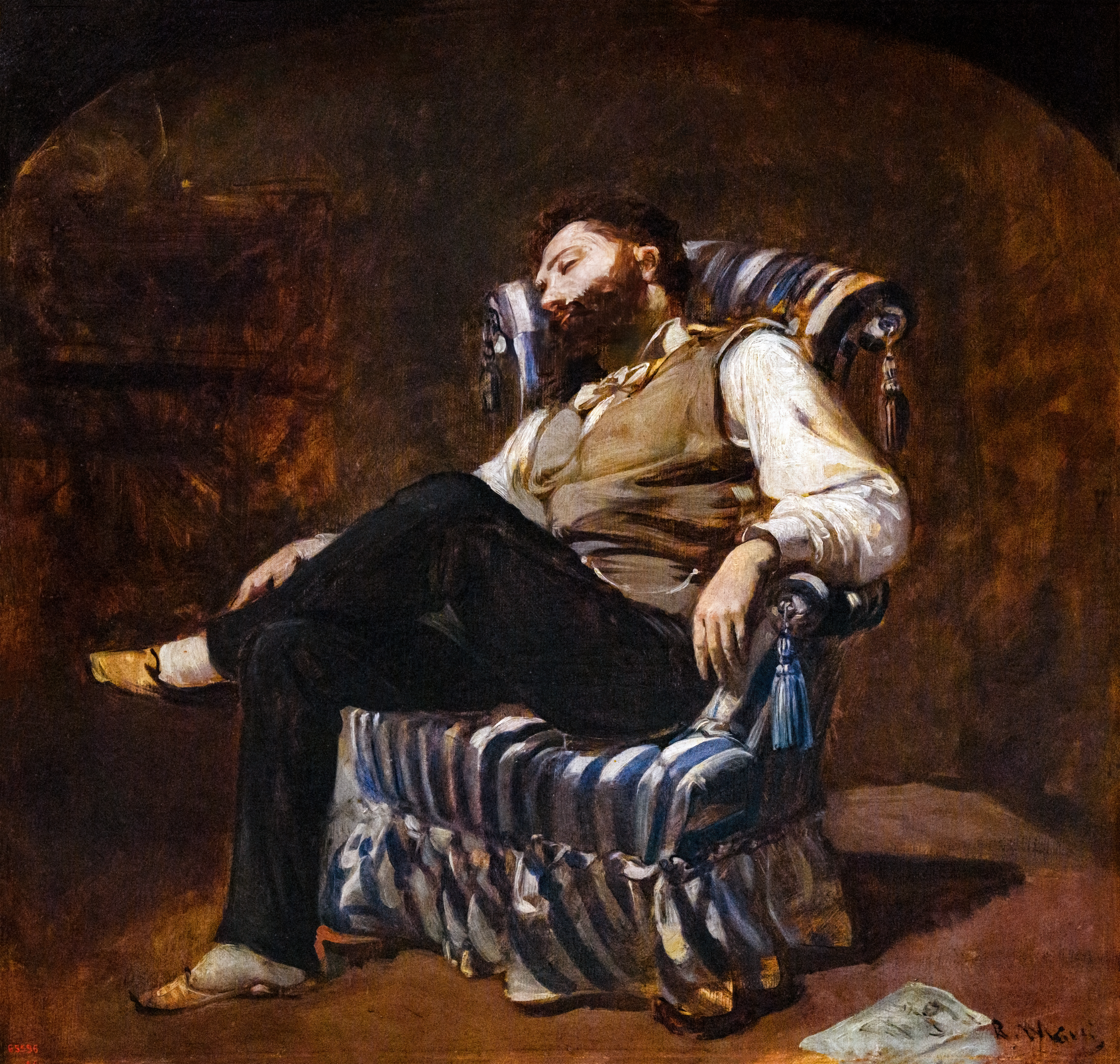
La Migdiata, Ramon Martí Alsina (MNAC).

Research shows that the practice of siesta has been misunderstood by Northern Europeans and North Americans, who traditionally work from 9 am to 5 pm, as if Spaniards did not work after the lunch break. However, in Spain, afternoon working hours typically last from 5 pm until 8pm or 9pm, and globally, the average Spaniard works 300 hours a year more than the average German and about 200 hours more than the average Dutch.

In any case, in modern Spain, the midday nap during the working week is being gradually abandoned among the adult working population. According to a 2009 survey, 16.2 percent of the population polled claimed to take a nap "daily", whereas 22 percent did so "sometimes", 3.2 percent "weekends only" and the remainder, 58.6 percent, "never". The share of those who claimed to have a nap daily had diminished by 7 percent compared to a previous poll in 1998. Nearly three out of four siesta-takers claimed to take siestas on the sofa rather than the bed. The habit is more likely among the elderly or during summer holidays, in order to avoid the high temperatures of the day and extend social life until the cooler late evenings and nights.

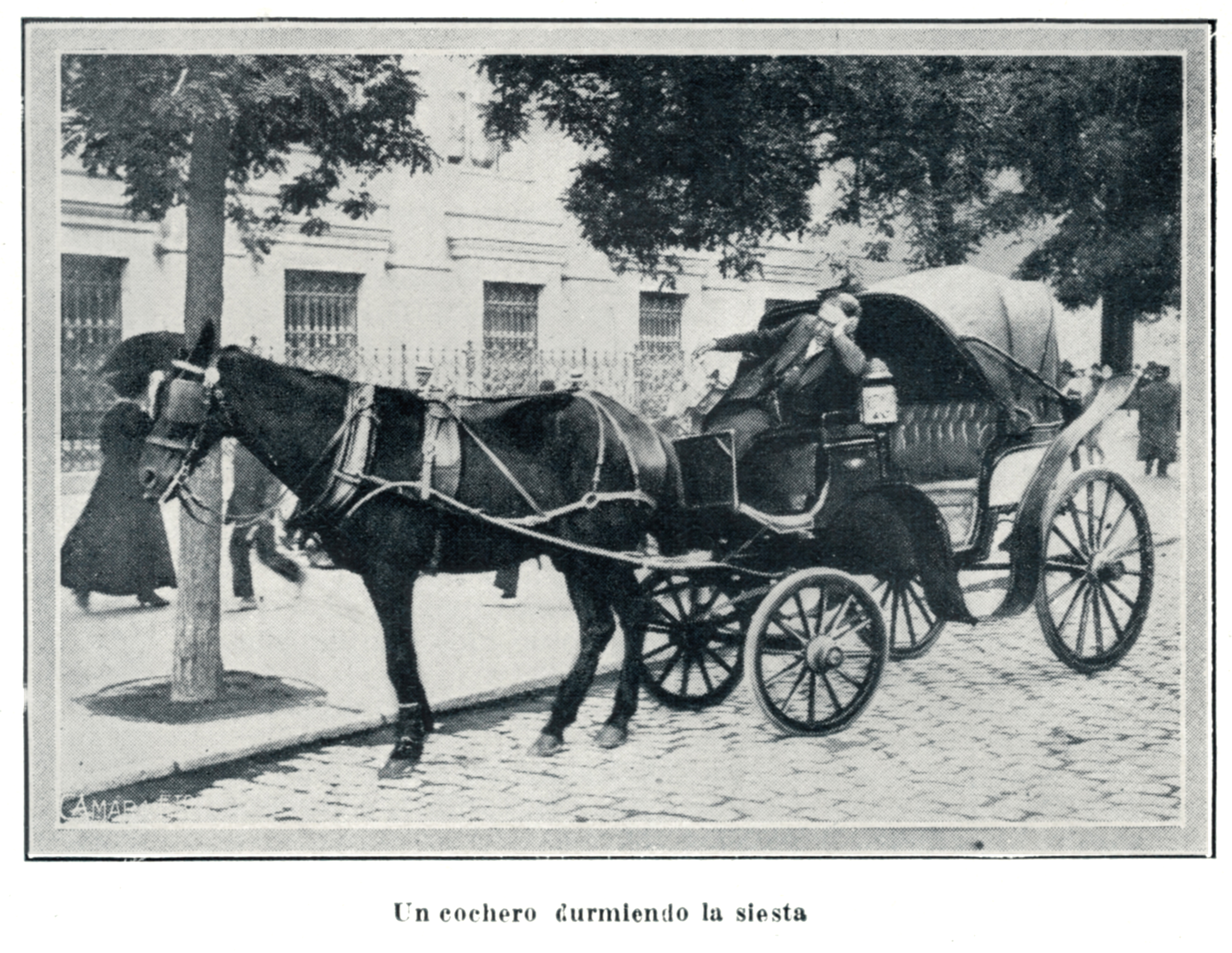
Spanish magazine Nuevo mundo, 1915

==== Italy ====
The midday nap is called with different names meaning little rest (riposino) or little sleep of the afternoon (sonnellino or pisolino pomeridiano). The regional name pennichella is also common The Spanish loanword siesta is less used .

In Southern Italy, the lunch break is sometimes called controra (from contro "counter" + ora "hour").

==== France ====
The siesta or méridienne was common in France until the 19th century. Paintings by Edouard Manet and Vincent van Gogh depict people from different social classes having a siesta. The fainting couch is a sort of chaise longue called méridienne in French.

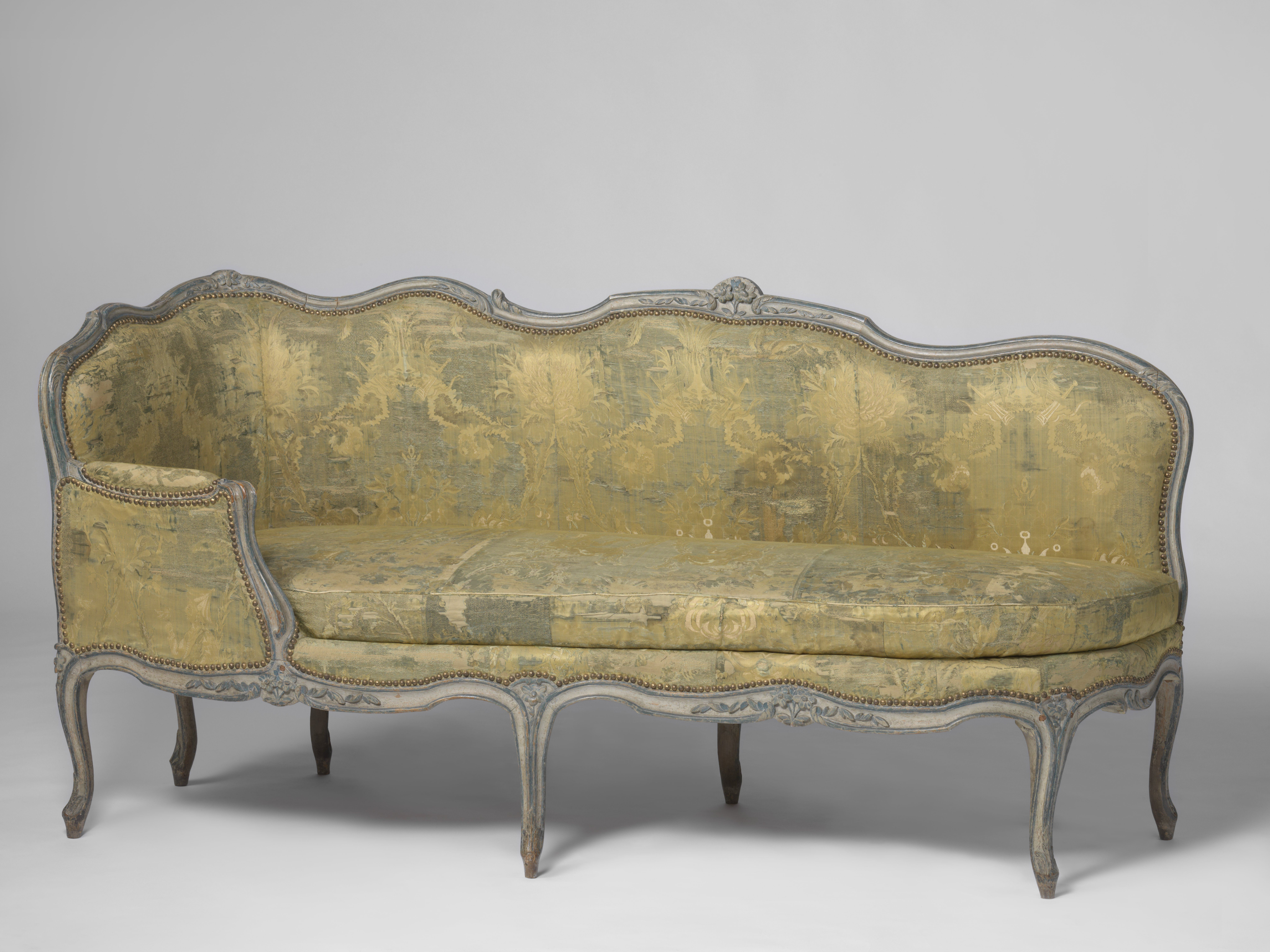
The fainting couch is called méridienne in French: its name literally means "siesta".

==== Balkans ====
In Dalmatia (coastal Croatia), the traditional afternoon nap is known as pižolot (from Venetian pixolotto).

Communist Yugoslavia set office working hours to 7am to 2pm to avoid siestas.

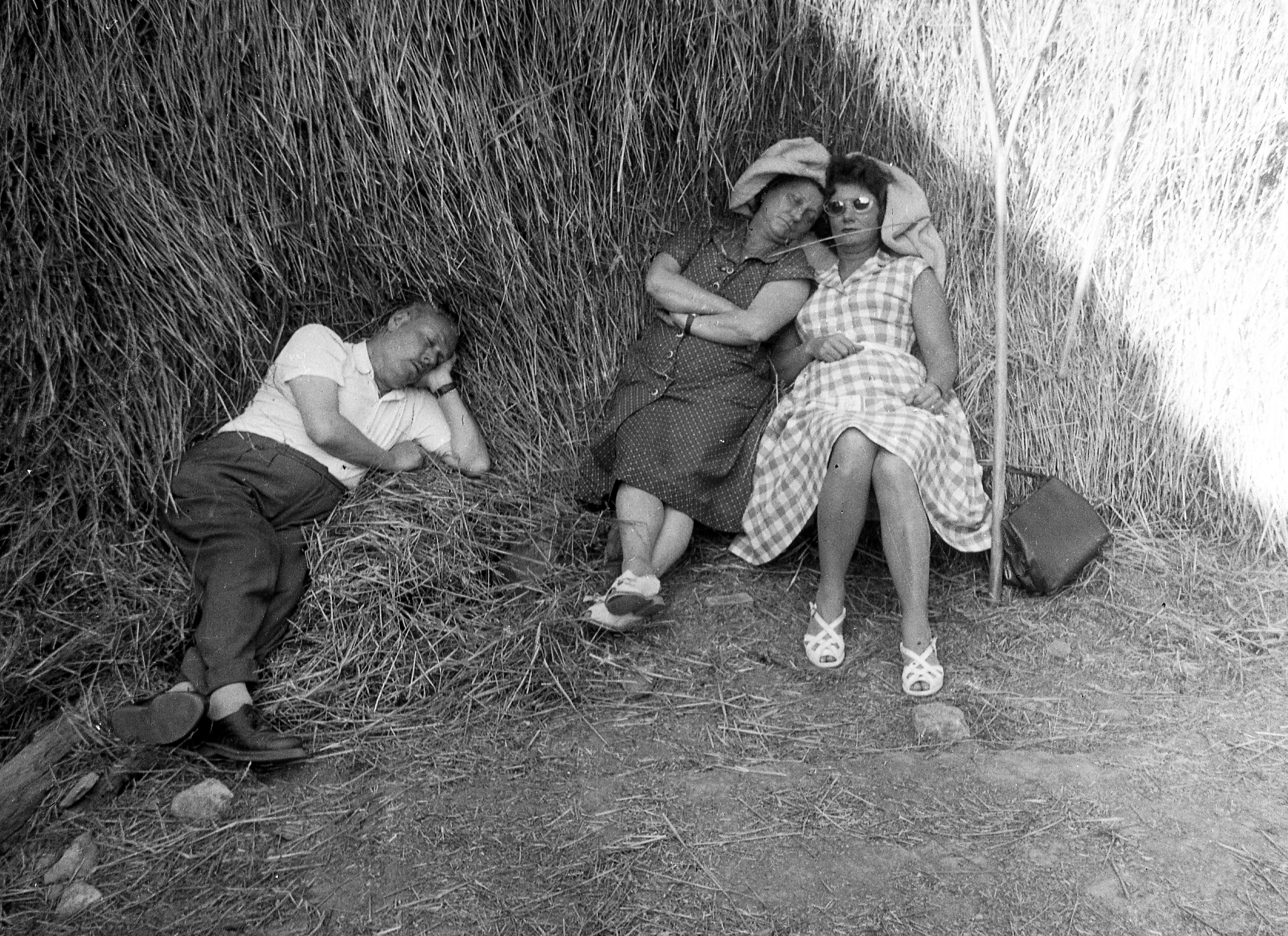
People taking a siesta in a haystack, Lendava, Yugoslavia, 1957

==== Greece ====
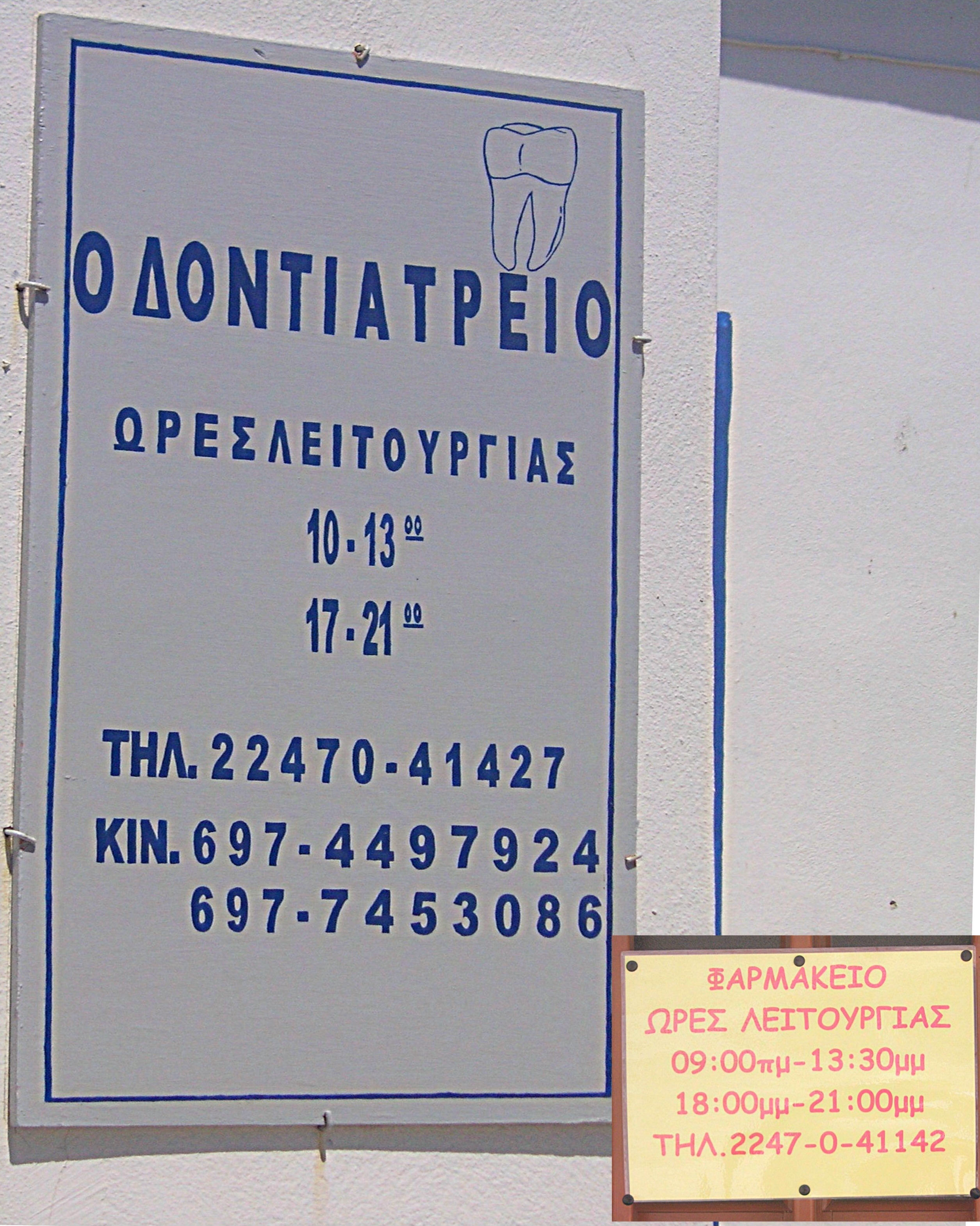
Dentist and pharmacist sharing similar business hours on the island of Lipsi, Greece

The midday nap is called Μεσημβρινός ύπνος "afternoon sleep".

The lunch break usually spans from 1 pm to 5 pm or 6pm, while afternoon working hours go to 9 pm. This means that a typical working day globally counts 8 hours, just like a 9-to-5 shift.

==== Russia ====
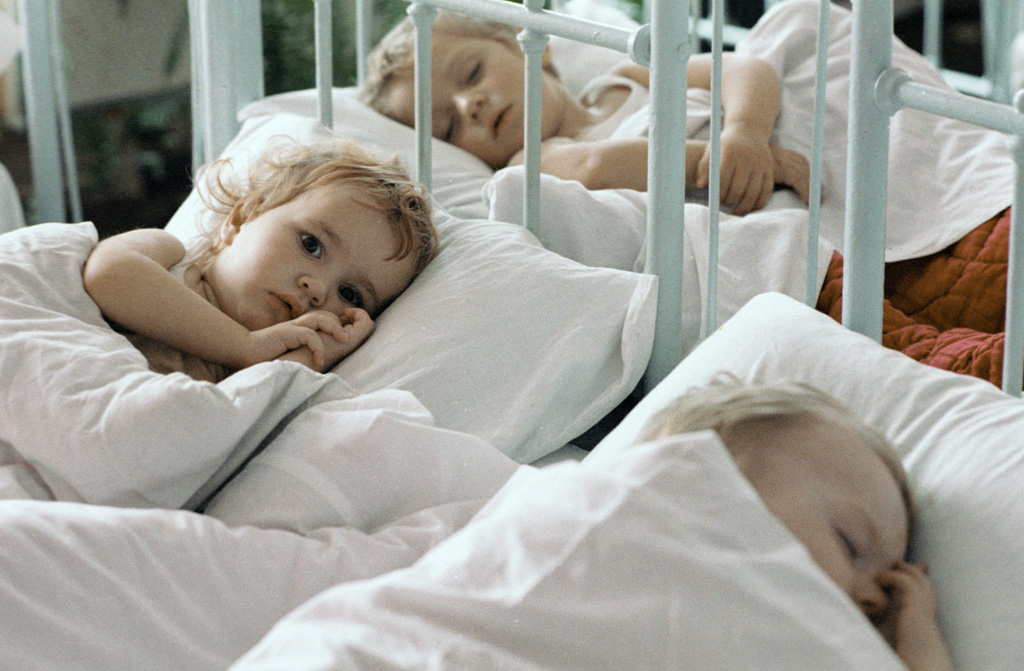
Midday nap in 1981, Soviet Union

Midday naps used to be the custom in Russia, with Adam Olearius stating such was "the custom of the Countrey, where sleep is as necessary after Dinner as in the Night". One source of hostility toward False Dmitriy I was that he did not "...indulge in the siesta."

=== Middle East ===
In muslim countries, midday rest is related to the practice of Qailulah (Arabic: قيلولة).

The Qailulah is a brief nap around the middle of the day, between the daily Dhuhr and Asr prayers. This practice is considered to be Mustahabb (encouraged, though not required), and is widely considered to have been recommended by the Islamic prophet Muhammad. Resting during midday also makes it easier for Muslims to be awake before dawn, to perform voluntary but encouraged acts such as tahajjud or suhur.

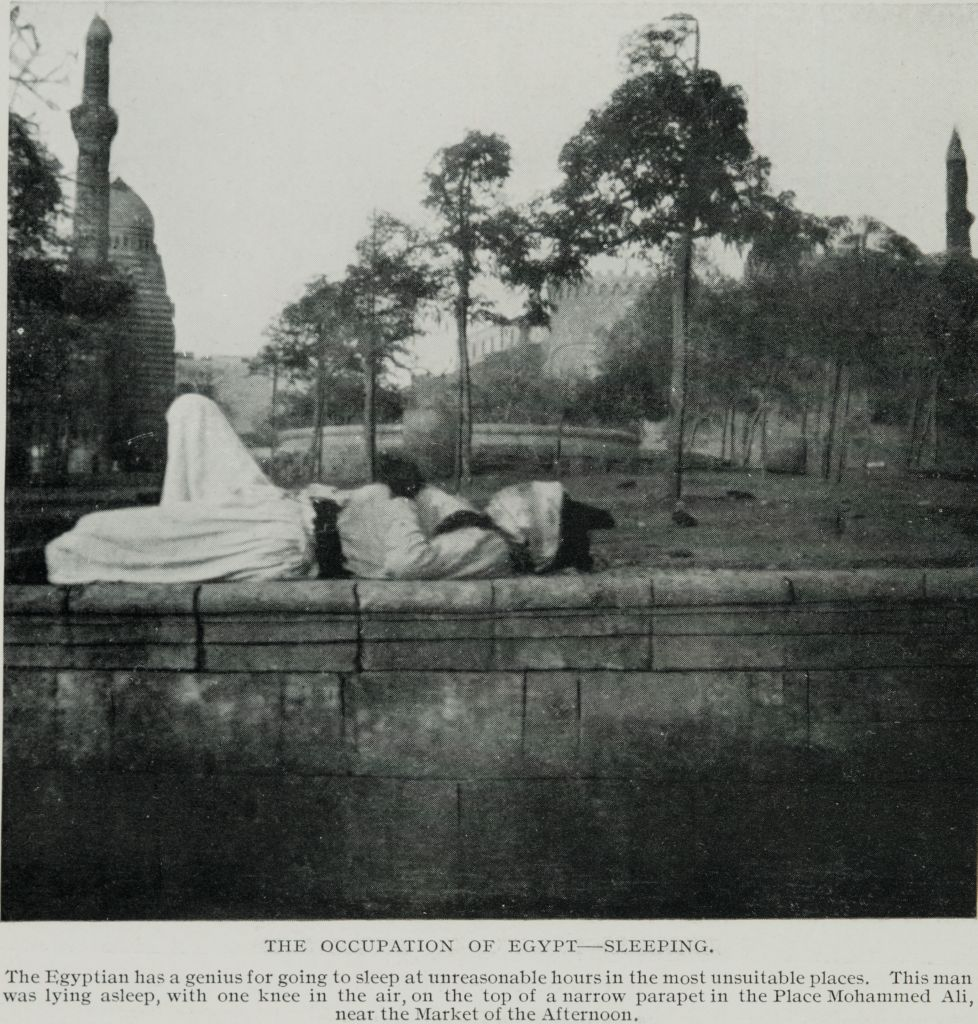
"The occupation of Egypt - Sleeping" British article of 1911. The photo of an Egyptian man sleeping during the day is taken as an example of a more general "will to sleep"

In Egypt and other Middle Eastern countries, government workers typically work for six hours a day, six days a week. Due to this schedule, workers do not eat lunch at work. Instead they leave work around midday to eat their main meal of the day. Following the heavy lunch, they take a nap (in Arabic, taaseela or qailulah), and have tea or coffee upon waking up before returning to work. For dinner, they usually have a smaller meal.

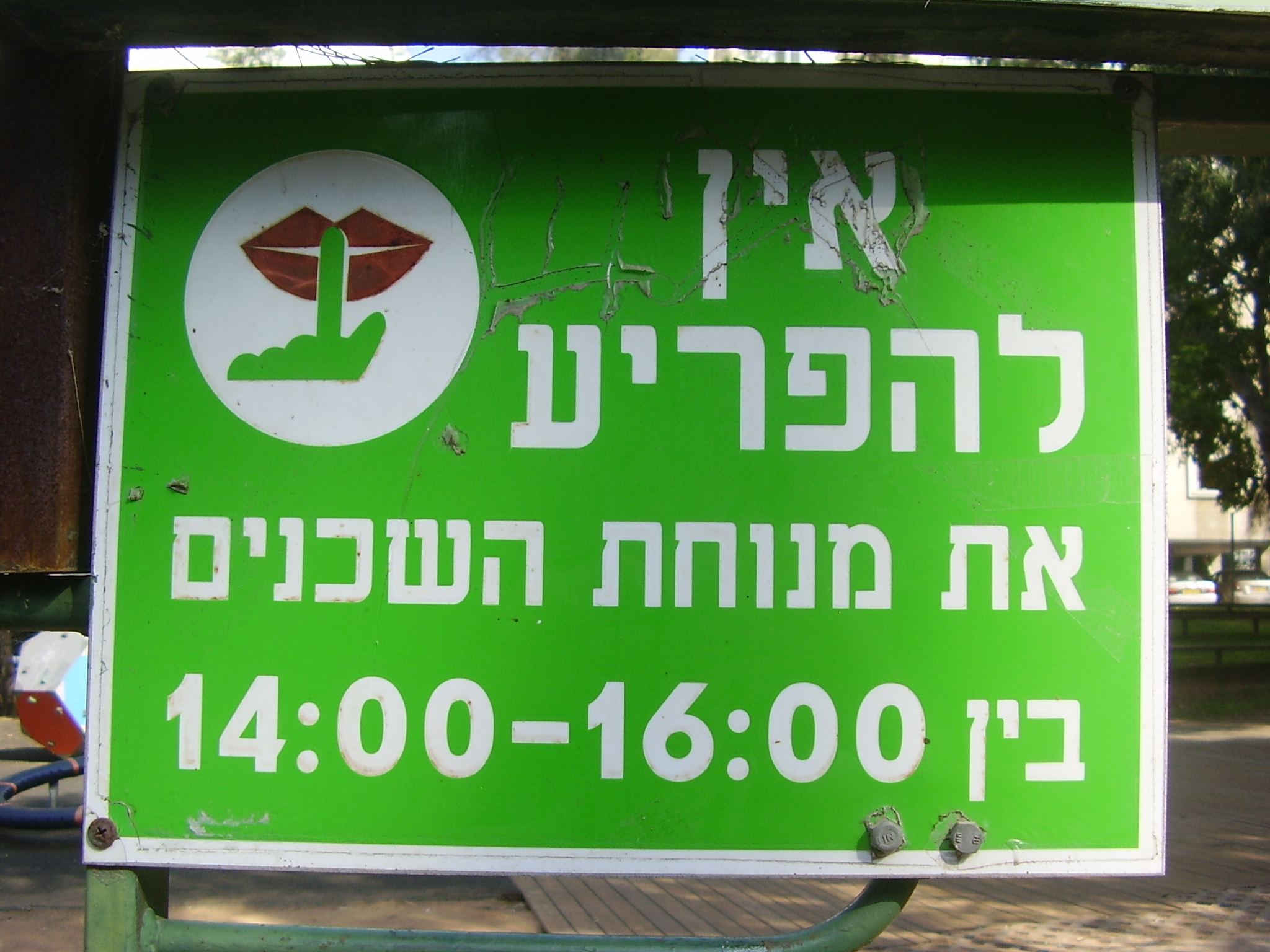
Israel 2012, Plaque about afternoon siesta between 14.00-16.00 in Giv'atayim עברית: שלט מנוחת הצהרים

In Israel midday nap is also possible.

=== Asia ===
==== China ====
In China, taking a nap after lunch, known as 午睡 wǔshuì (lit. 'noon sleep'), is a common practice among people. Surveys indicate that about two-thirds of the Chinese population habitually takes afternoon naps, with the average duration being approximately 30 minutes.

== Power nap ==
Longtime considered a sign of "laziness" in the English-speaking world, the midday nap is currently being revitalised in the United States, the United Kingdom, and a growing number of English-speaking countries, under the name of "power nap". Power nap is originally a term coined by Cornell University social psychologist James Maas and recognized by other research scientists such as Sara Mednick as well as in the popular press.

This comes with a workplace cultural shift that emphasises the necessity of sleep and rest.

== Types of siesta ==
There are several kinds of siesta

- Siesta relámpago: less than 5 minutes;
- Siesta relax: between 5 and 30 minutes;
- Siesta regia: more than 30 minutes;
- Cafè-siesta: taking a coffee before taking a short nap.

Research on power naps is currently unpacking these different kinds of rest.

== Biological need for naps ==
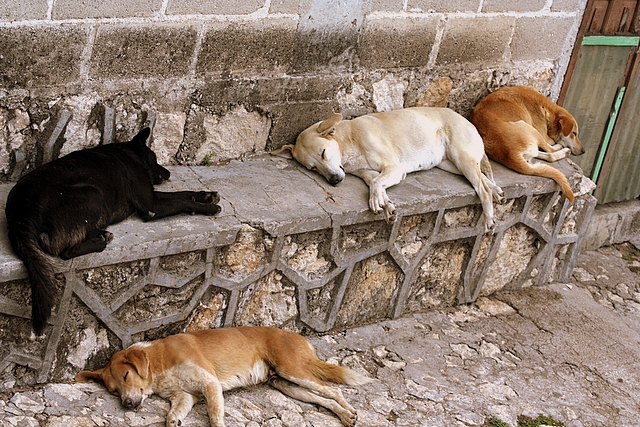
Dogs taking a siesta in San Cristóbal de las Casas, Mexico

Factors explaining the geographical distribution of the modern siesta are warm temperatures and heavy intake of food at midday meals. Combined, these two factors contribute to the feeling of post-lunch drowsiness. In many countries that practice the siesta, the summer heat can be unbearable in the early afternoon, making a midday break at home welcome.

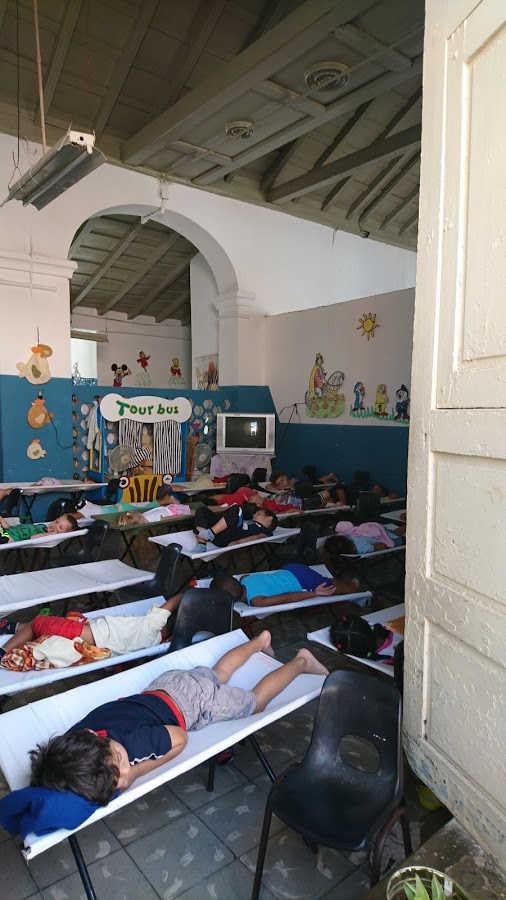
Children taking a siesta at school in Trinidad de Cuba

The timing of sleep in humans depends upon a balance between homeostatic sleep propensity, the need for sleep as a function of the amount of time elapsed since the last adequate sleep episode, and circadian rhythms which determine the ideal timing of a correctly structured and restorative sleep episode. The homeostatic pressure to sleep starts growing upon awakening. The circadian signal for wakefulness starts building in the (late) afternoon. As professor of sleep medicine Charles Czeisler notes, "the circadian system is set up in a beautiful way to override the homeostatic drive for sleep."

Thus, in many people, there is a dip when the drive for sleep has been building for hours and the drive for wakefulness has not yet started. This is, again quoting Czeisler, "a great time for a nap". The drive for wakefulness intensifies through the evening, making it difficult to get to sleep 2–3 hours before one's usual bedtime when the wake maintenance zone ends.

== Cardiovascular benefits ==
The Washington Post of 13 February 2007 reports at length on studies in Greece that indicate that those who nap have less risk of heart attacks.

The siesta habit has been associated with a 37 percent reduction in coronary mortality, possibly due to reduced cardiovascular stress mediated by daytime sleep.

Epidemiological studies on the relations between cardiovascular health and siesta have led to conflicting conclusions, possibly because of poor control of confounding variables, such as physical activity. It is possible that people who take a siesta have different physical activity habits, for example, waking earlier and scheduling more activity during the morning. Such differences in physical activity may lead to different 24-hour profiles in cardiovascular function. Even if such effects of physical activity can be discounted in explaining the relationship between siesta and cardiovascular health, it is still not known whether the daytime nap itself, a supine posture, or the expectancy of a nap is the most important factor.

== Mental and social benefits ==
While "siesta" means napping, the siesta period can better be described as a "de-stress" period. If Spaniards do sleep, many simply fall asleep on their sofa rather than putting on pajamas and going to bed. This rest period allows Spaniards to unwind, allowing them to return to work feeling refreshed and avoid burnout from working nonstop. By living in Spain, one will find that the goal of the siesta period is not only related to productivity, but rather a mental tool designed to alleviate the pressures of the busy work life. Another student notes that the siesta allows individuals to practice being present, thus building deeper relationships. The student also reports that despite breaking from work for siesta, Spaniards are very hardworking.

== See also ==
- Aestivation
- Power nap
- Nap
