= Power nap =

Short sleep

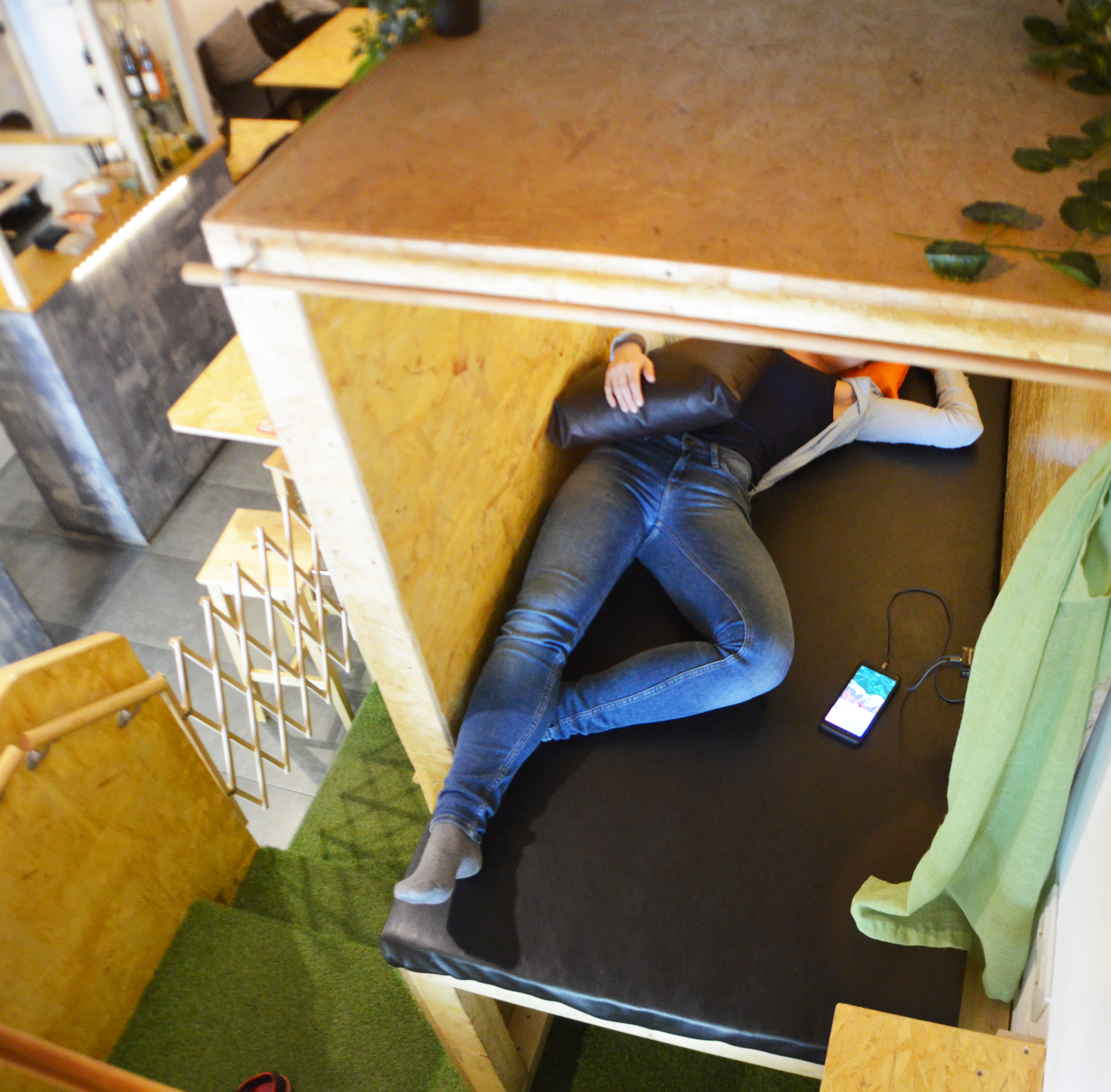
A woman having a nap in a napping pod, in the café Nappuccino in Barcelona, Catalonia (Spain)

A power nap or cat nap is a short sleep that terminates before deep sleep (slow-wave sleep; SWS). A power nap is intended to quickly revitalize the sleeper. The practice is connected to the custom of midday nap of many traditional societies around the world, with the difference that it has been studied and assessed by research.

There are different types of power naps, very much like the Spanish siesta For example, a power nap combined with consuming caffeine is called a stimulant nap, coffee nap, caffeine nap, or nappuccino (see cafè siesta in Spanish).

== Origins of the term ==
The expression "power nap" was coined by Cornell University social psychologist James Maas. and recognized by other research scientists such as Sara Mednick as well as in the popular press.

== Characteristics ==
A power nap, also known as a Stage 2 nap, is a short slumber of 20 minutes or less which terminates before the occurrence of deep slow-wave sleep, intended to quickly revitalize the napper. The 20-minute nap increases alertness and motor skills. Various durations may be recommended for power naps, which are short compared to regular sleep. The short duration prevents nappers from sleeping so long that they enter the slow wave portion of the normal sleep cycle without being able to complete the cycle. Entering deep, slow-wave sleep and failing to complete the normal sleep cycle can result in a phenomenon known as sleep inertia, where one feels groggy, disoriented, and even sleepier than before beginning the nap. In order to attain optimal post-nap performance, a Stage 2 nap must be limited to the beginning of a sleep cycle, specifically sleep stages N1 and N2, typically 18–25 minutes.

Experimental confirmation of the benefits of this brief nap comes from a Flinders University study in Australia in which 5, 10, 20, or 30-minute periods of sleep were given. The greatest immediate improvement in measures of alertness and cognitive performance came after the 10 minutes of sleep. The 20 and 30-minute periods of sleep showed evidence of sleep inertia immediately after the naps and improvements in alertness more than 30 minutes later, but not to a greater level than after the 10 minutes of sleep. Power naps are effective even when schedules allow a full night's sleep.

== Health effects ==
Short (half-hour) power naps can restore alertness, performance, and learning ability. Such naps are also associated with increased morbidity and mortality.

== Stimulant nap ==
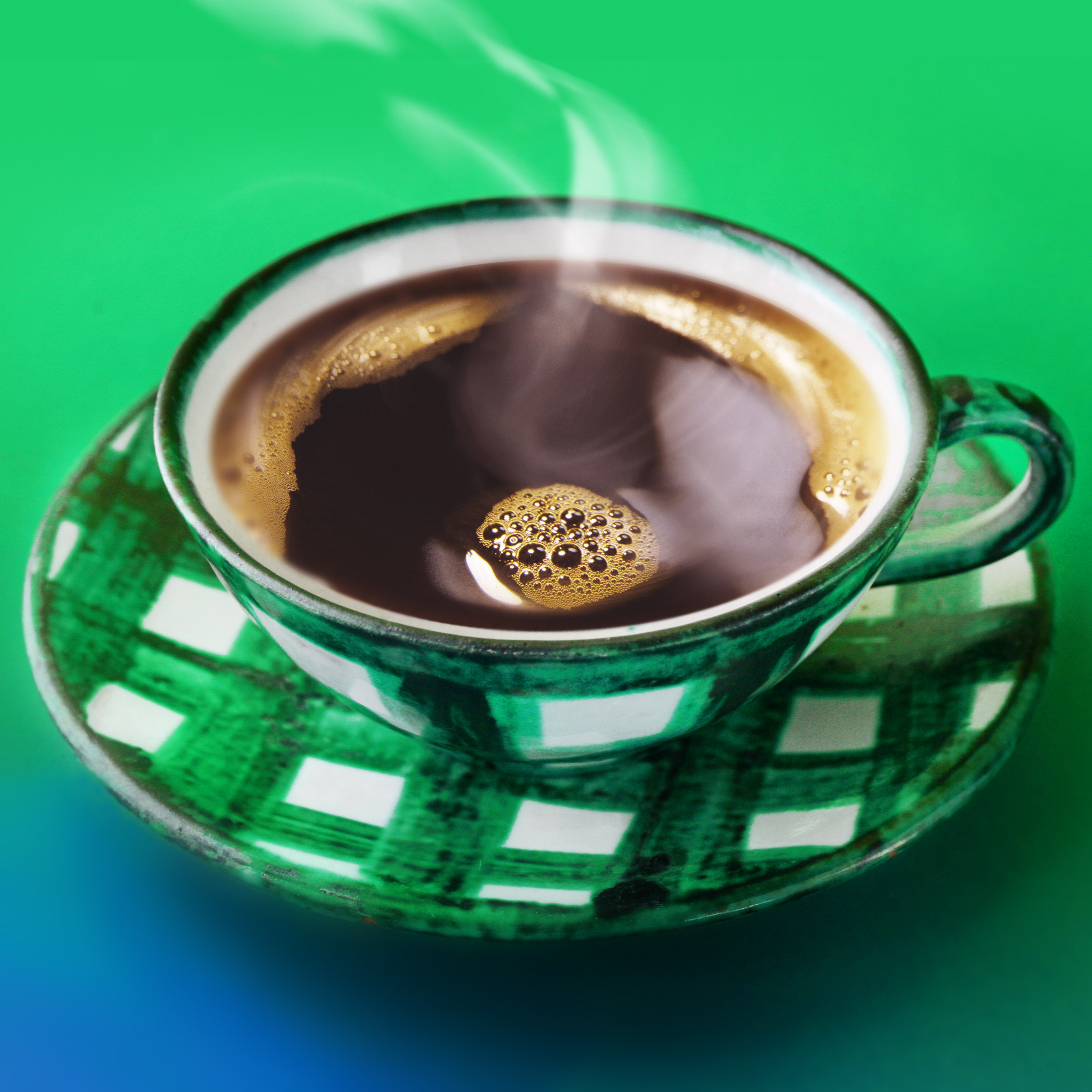
A coffee nap is drinking a cup of coffee before a short 15-minute nap.

A stimulant nap is a brief period of sleep of around 15 minutes, preceded by consuming a caffeinated drink or another stimulant.

It may combat daytime drowsiness more effectively than napping or drinking coffee alone. A stimulant nap is more effective than regular naps in improving post-nap alertness and cognitive functioning. In a driving simulator and a series of studies, Horne and Reyner investigated the effects of cold air, radio, a break with no nap, a nap, caffeine pill vs. placebo and a short nap preceded by caffeine on mildly sleep-deprived subjects. A nap with caffeine was by far the most effective in reducing driving accidents and subjective sleepiness as it helps the body get rid of the sleep-inducing chemical compound adenosine. Caffeine in coffee takes up to half an hour to have an alerting effect, hence "a short (<15min) nap will not be compromised if it is taken immediately after the coffee." One account suggested that it was like a "double shot of energy" from the stimulating boost from caffeine plus better alertness from napping. This procedure has been studied on sleep-deprived humans given the task of driving a motor vehicle afterwards, although it has not been studied on elderly populations.

== Nap rooms and tech aided naps ==
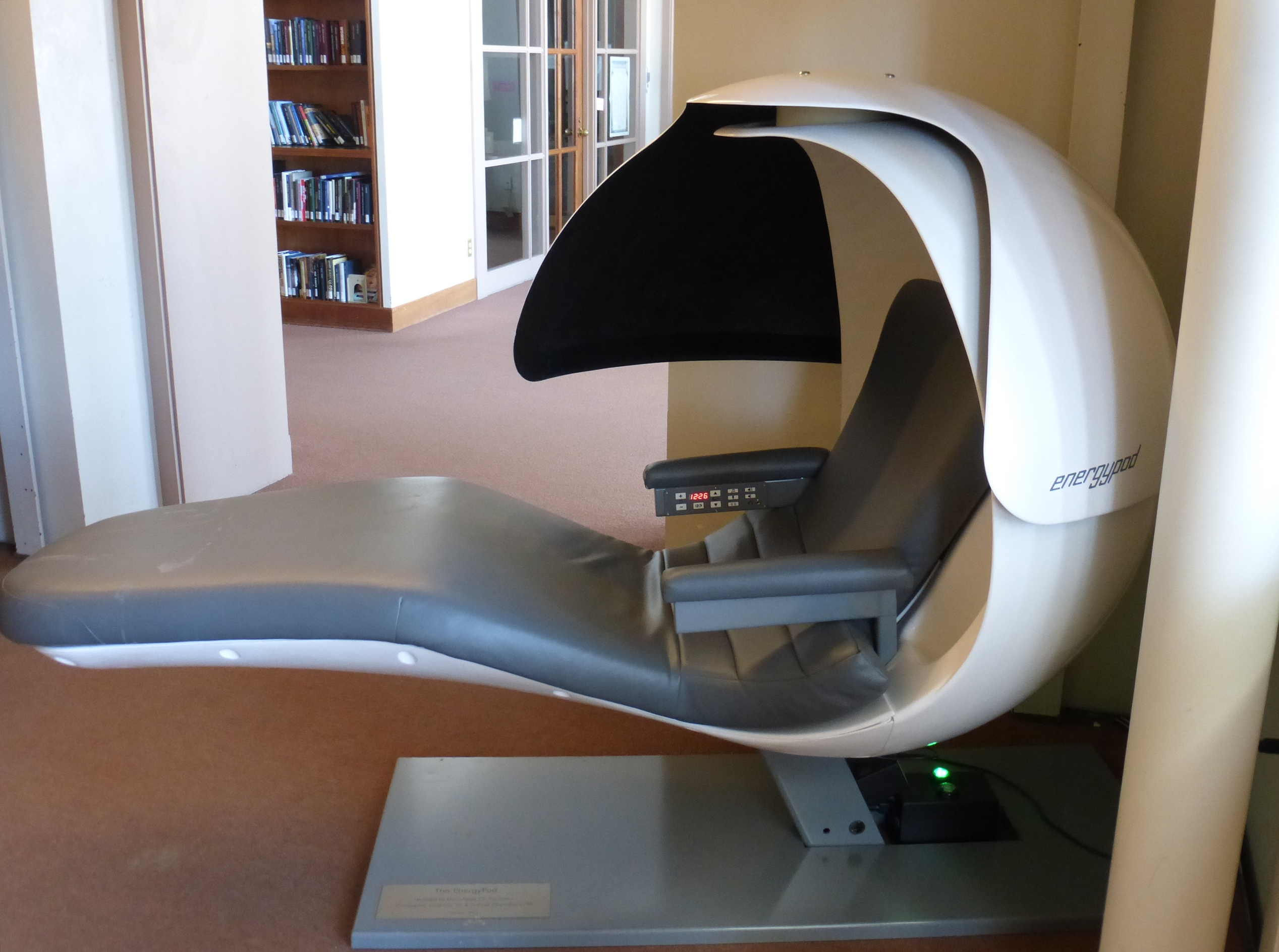
EnergyPod, a sleeping pod, located in a small nap room of the Olin library at Wesleyan University

Some companies have nap rooms to allow employees to take power naps. This may be in a form of a nap room with a recliner, or chairs specially designed for power napping installed in a designated area. Companies with nap rooms say that employees are happier and become more productive at work.

Similar nap rooms and stations also exist in higher education institutions. Many colleges and universities provide napping furnitures such as cots and beanbags in libraries for students to take naps after long periods of study. At least one university has a nap room set up in a gym. Some medical schools also set up nap rooms at teaching hospitals. The nap rooms may include sleeping pods or cots, white noise machines, and antimicrobial pillows.

In Barcelona, there is a café called Nappuccino that implements custom-built napping pods inside the café.

A more portable aid is a nap timer app. Apps have various features including aided sounds, nap history and pattern tracking and daily reminders that make it easier to take naps.

== Traditional midday nap ==
Longtime considered a sign of "laziness" in the English-speaking world, the midday nap is currently being revitalised in the United States, the United Kingdom, and other English-speaking countries This comes with a workplace cultural shift that emphasises the necessity of sleep and rest

In fact, midday naps are a widespread tradition in many countries, particularly those in warm-weather zones: the Mediterranean, Southern Europe (it. pisolino pomeridiano "little afternoon nap", gr. μεσημβρινός ύπνος "afternoon sleep"), the Middle East ( قيلولة, Qailulah), Russia, South and Southeast Asia and mainland China (午睡, wǔshuì). Through Spanish influence, midday naps are also common in most of Latin America and the Philippines.

Some historians point out that taking a long lunch break including a nap was a tradition also in American south. However, this was very probably limited to the élite social class, such as masters, while slaves were not allowed to rest This practice is depicted in the book and the film Gone with the wind.

== See also ==
- Sleeping while on duty – Falling asleep while working
- Midday nap – Short nap taken in the early afternoon
