= The Siesta (Van Gogh) =

Painting by Vincent van Gogh

The Siesta (La méridienne dit aussi La sieste)
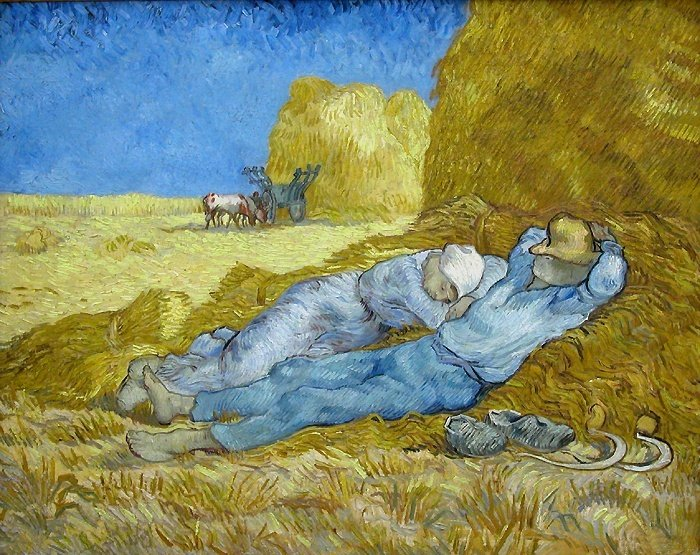
- Artist: Vincent van Gogh
- Year: 1889–1890
- Catalogue: F686; JH1881
- Medium: Oil on canvas
- Dimensions: 73 cm × 91 cm (29 in × 36 in)
- Location: Musée d'Orsay, Paris

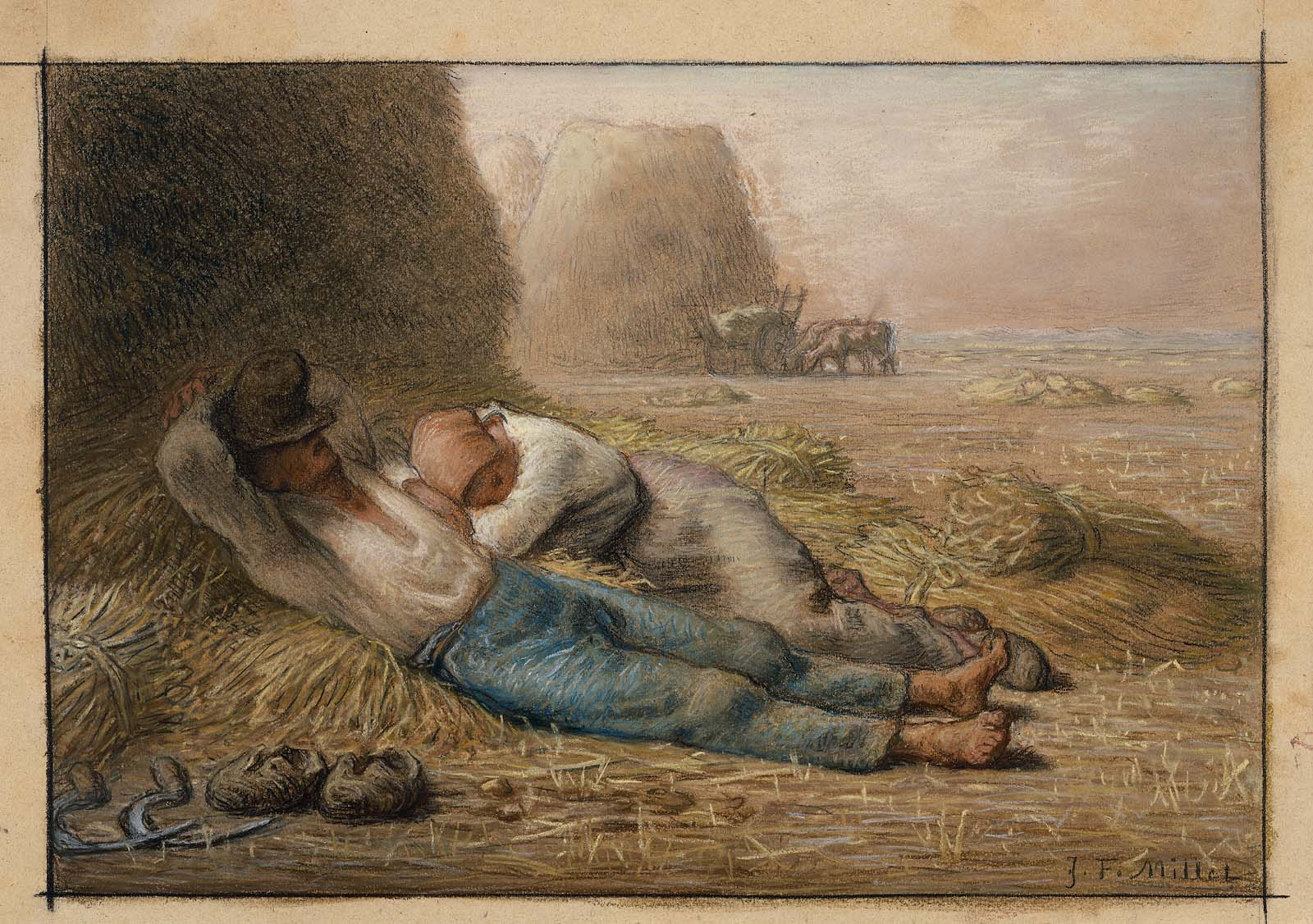
Jean-François Millet, La méridienne,

The Siesta (in French, La méridienne or La sieste) is an oil on canvas painting by Vincent van Gogh painted between December 1889 and January 1890 while he was interned in a mental asylum in the French town of Saint-Rémy-de-Provence. It is part of the permanent collection of the Musée d'Orsay, in Paris.

Van Gogh chooses as his theme the siesta, while referring directly to the painting by the same name by French painter Jean Millet. Even despite the peaceful nature of the subject, the paintings radiates Van Gogh's renowned artistic intensity. Also known in French as La méridienne, Van Gogh's The Siesta has been considered one of his masterpieces.

== See also ==
- List of works by Vincent van Gogh
