= Sleeping while on duty =

Falling asleep while working

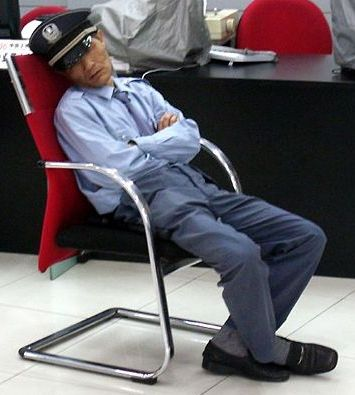
A security officer sleeping on duty

Sleeping while on duty or sleeping on the job – falling asleep while one is not supposed to – is considered gross misconduct and grounds for disciplinary action, including termination of employment, in some occupations. Recently however, there has been a movement in support of sleeping, or napping at work, with scientific studies highlighting health and productivity benefits, and over 6% of employers in some countries providing facilities to do so. In some types of work, such as firefighting or live-in caregiving, sleeping at least part of the shift may be an expected part of paid work time. While some employees who sleep while on duty in violation do so intentionally and hope not to get caught, others intend in good faith to stay awake, and accidentally doze.

Sleeping while on duty is such an important issue that it is addressed in the employee handbook in some workplaces. Concerns that employers have may include the lack of productivity, the unprofessional appearance, and danger that may occur when the employee's duties involve watching to prevent a hazardous situation. In some occupations, such as pilots, truck and bus drivers, or those operating heavy machinery, falling asleep while on duty puts lives in danger. However, in many countries, these workers are supposed to take a break and rest every few hours.

== Frequency ==
The frequency of sleeping while on duty that occurs varies depending on the time of day. Daytime employees are more likely to take short naps, while graveyard shift workers have a higher likelihood of sleeping for a large portion of their shift, sometimes intentionally.

A survey by the National Sleep Foundation has found that 30% of participants have admitted to sleeping while on duty. More than 90% of Americans have experienced a problem at work because of a poor night's sleep. One in four admit to shirking duties on the job for the same reason, either calling in sick or napping during work hours.

In a 2026 survey, 56% of Icelandair pilots admitted to falling asleep while flying in the past three months.

== Views ==
Employers have varying views of sleeping while on duty. Some companies have instituted policies to allow employees to take napping breaks during the workday in order to improve productivity while others are strict when dealing with employees who sleep while on duty and use high-tech means, such as video surveillance, to catch their employees who may be sleeping on the job. Those who are caught in violation may face disciplinary action such as suspension or firing.

Some employees sleep, nap, or take a power-nap only during their allotted break time at work. This may or may not be permitted, depending on the employer's policies. Some employers may prohibit sleeping, even during unpaid break time, for various reasons, such as the unprofessional appearance of a sleeping employee, the need for an employee to be available during an emergency, or legal regulations. Employees who may endanger others by sleeping on the job may face more serious consequences, such as legal sanctions. For example, airline pilots risk loss of their licenses.

In some industries and work cultures sleeping at work is permitted and even encouraged. Such work cultures typically have flexible schedules, and variant work loads with extremely demanding periods where employees feel unable to spend time commuting. In such environments it is common for employers to provide makeshift sleeping materials for employees, such as a couch and/or inflatable mattress and blankets. This practice is particularly common in start-ups and during political campaigns. In those work cultures sleeping in the office is seen as evidence of dedication.

In 1968, New York police officers admitted that sleeping while on duty was customary.

In Japan, the practice of napping in public, called inemuri (居眠り; lit. "present while sleeping"), may occur in work meetings or classes. Brigitte Steger, a scholar who focuses on Japanese culture, writes that sleeping at work is considered a sign of dedication to the job, such that one has stayed up late doing work or worked to the point of complete exhaustion, and may therefore be excusable.

== Notable incidents ==
=== Airline pilots ===
- February 2008 – pilots for Go! airline were suspended amid an investigation that they fell asleep mid-flight after departing from Honolulu and overshot the destination of Hilo Airport by about 24 kilometers (15 miles) before finally waking up, turning around, and making a safe landing.
- January 2024 – pilots of a Batik Air flight were suspended for reportedly falling asleep during a domestic Indonesia flight from Haluoleo Airport to Soekarno-Hatta Airport, overshooting their destination by 210 nautical miles. The co-pilot had severe sleep disruptions due to caring for his one-month-old twin babies and simultaneously moving to a new house.

=== Air traffic controllers ===
- October 1984 – Aeroflot Flight 3352 crashed into maintenance vehicles on the runway while landing in Omsk, Russia, killing a total of 178 people. The ground controller had been awake for nights recently because he had just become a father of two. He allowed workers to dry the runway during heavy rain and fell asleep on the job, failing to warn workers about the incoming plane. The controller later killed himself in prison.
- October 2007 – four Italian air traffic controllers were suspended after they were caught asleep while on duty.
- March 2011 – the lone night shift air traffic controller at Ronald Reagan Washington National Airport fell asleep on duty. During the period he was asleep two airliners landed uneventfully. In the weeks that followed, there were other similar incidents and it was revealed that other lone air traffic controllers on duty fell asleep in the towers. This led to the resignation of United States air traffic chief Hank Krakowski and a new policy being set requiring two controllers to be on duty at all times.

=== Bus drivers ===
- March 2011 – a tour bus driver crashed while returning from a casino in Connecticut to New York City. Fifteen people were killed and many others injured. Although the driver, who was found to be sober, denied sleeping, a survivor who witnessed the crash reported that he was speeding and sleeping.

=== Police and security officers ===
- December 1947 – a Washington, D.C. police officer was fined $75 for sleeping while on duty.
- October 2007 – a CBS news story revealed nearly a dozen security guards at a nuclear power plant who were videotaped sleeping while on duty.
- December 2009 – The New York Post published a photo of a prison guard sleeping next to an inmate at the Rikers Island penitentiary. The photo was allegedly captured on the cell phone camera of another guard. Both guards were disciplined for this action, the sleeping officer for sleeping and the officer who took the photo for violating a prison policy forbidding cell phones while on duty. The inmate was not identified.
- August 2019 – Jeffrey Epstein's prison guards were recorded sleeping and online shopping while on duty even though Epstein was on suicide watch. After Epstein was found dead in his cell, an investigation of the prison guards was launched. U.S. prosecutors eventually dropped their criminal case against the prison guards.
- June 2025 – the Philippine National Police implemented 8-hour duty per day to reduce risk of sleeping, such as case of two officers in Cebu City dismissed in June 2023.

=== Other ===
- March 1987 – The Peach Bottom Nuclear Generating Station was ordered shut down by the Nuclear Regulatory Commission after four operators were found sleeping while on duty.
- September 2012 - While interviewing Sweeny Murti on his radio show, Mike Francesa was spotted sleeping while on duty. Francesa initially denied it, but later admitted that he had been taking care of his son Harrison, who had fallen ill.

== See also ==
- Nap
- Power nap
- Presenteeism – Act or culture of working while sick
