= Nape (disambiguation) =

Nape is the back of the neck.

Nape or NAPE may also refer to:

== Places ==
- Nape (Lesbos), a town of ancient Lesbos
- Napé, an administrative center town in Laos

== People ==
- Nape 'a Motana (born 1945), South African writer
- Nape Nnauye, 21st century Tanzanian politician
- David Nape (1870–1913), composer, member of the Royal Hawaiian Band, inducted into the Hawaiian Music Hall of Fame
- Isaac Nape, South African researcher and lecturer
- Jeffery Nape (1964–2016), Speaker of the National Parliament and Governor-General of Papua New Guinea

== Mythology ==
- Nape (Wildwood), one of the female dogs of the hunter Actaeon. Like the rest of the pack, she also devoured her master when he was transformed into a stag by Artemis, goddess of the hunt.

== NAPE ==
- N-Acylphosphatidyletthanolamine, a class of hormone
- German National Action Plan on Energy Efficiency (German: Nationale Aktionsplan Energieeffizienz)
- National Academy for Primary Education, a Bangladesh government academy training primary school teachers
- NAPE Foundation, a non-profit organization which supports disadvantaged students in Ghana
- Newfoundland Association of Public and Private Employees, a union in Newfoundland & Labrador
