= Nappe (disambiguation) =

A nappe, in geology, is a sheet of rock moved more than 2 km above a thrust fault.

Nappe may also refer to:

- Nappe (water), in hydraulic engineering, a sheet of water flowing over a dam or similar structure
- Nappe (geometry), either half of a double cone
- Orlando Nappe (c. 1931–2007), Argentine footballer

== See also ==
- Nap (disambiguation)
- Nape (disambiguation)
- Napp (disambiguation)
- Nappage, in baking, a glazing technique
