= Napp =

Napp or NAPP may refer to:

- Napp, Norway, a village
- Napp Pharmaceuticals, a British pharmaceutical manufacturer
- Cyril František Napp (1792–1867), Austrian abbot
- Larry Napp (1916–1993), American baseball umpire

== Acronyms ==
- NAPP (database) (Nucleic Acid Phylogenetic Profile Database)
- National Association of Patent Practitioners
- National Association of Photoshop Professionals
- National Association of Priest Pilots
- North Atlantic Population Project
- National Assembly of People's Power

== See also ==
- Nap (disambiguation)
- Nappe (disambiguation)
- Gnap (disambiguation)
