= White noise machine =

Sound-producing device

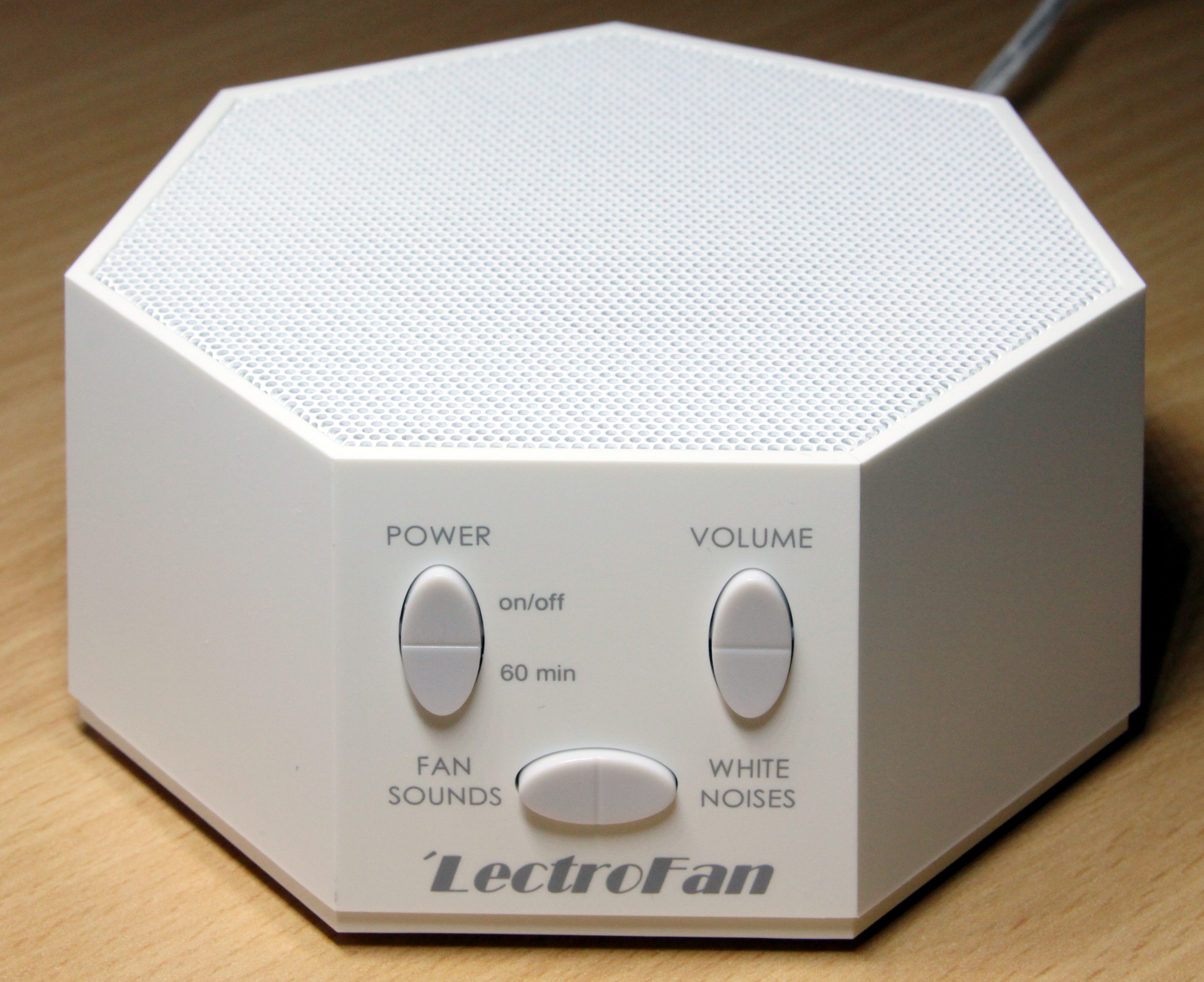
A LectroFan white noise machine

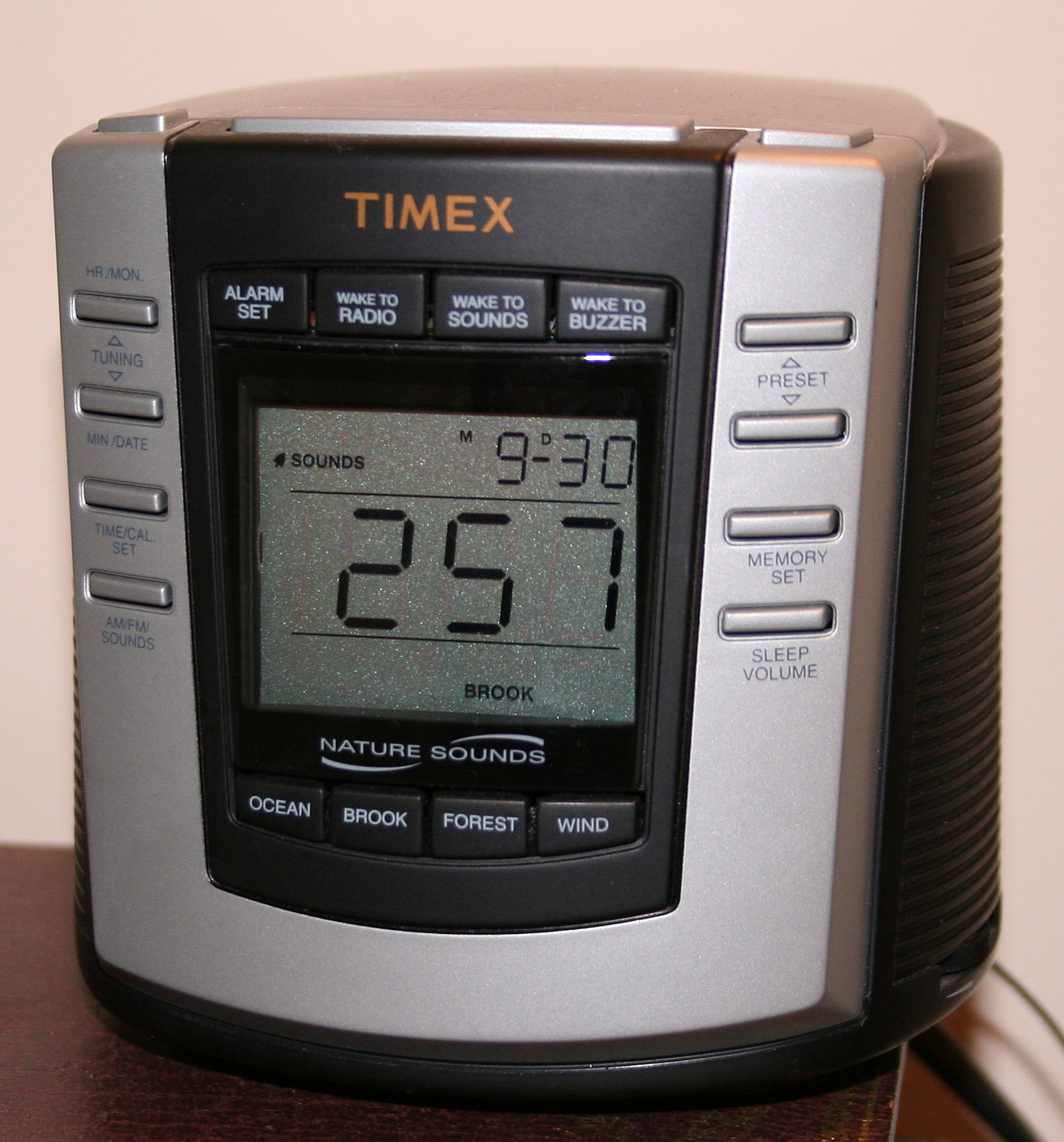
A clock radio that includes a white noise machine

A white noise machine is a device that produces a noise that is intended to calm the listener, which in many cases sounds like a rushing waterfall or wind blowing through trees, and other serene or nature-like sounds. Often such devices do not produce actual white noise, which has a harsh sound, but pink noise, whose power rolls off at higher frequencies, or other colors of noise.

== Use ==
White noise devices are available from numerous manufacturers in many forms, for a variety of different uses, including audio testing, sound masking, sleep-aid, and power-napping. Sleep-aid and nap machine products may also produce other soothing sounds, such as music, rain, wind, highway traffic and ocean waves mixed with—or modulated by—white noise. Electric fans are a common alternative, although some Asian communities historically avoided using fans due to the superstition that a fan could suffocate them while sleeping. White noise generators are often used by people with tinnitus to mask their symptoms. The sounds generated by digital machines are not always truly random. Rather, they are short prerecorded audio-tracks which continuously repeat at the end of the track.

Manufacturers of sound-masking devices recommend that the volume of white noise machines be initially set at a comfortable level, even if it does not provide the desired level of privacy. As the ear becomes accustomed to the new sound and learns to tune it out, the volume can be gradually increased to increase privacy. Manufacturers of sleeping aids and power-napping devices recommend that the volume level be set slightly louder than normal music listening level, but always in a comfortable listening range.

Sound and noise have their own measurement and color coding techniques, which allows specialized users to identify noise and sound according to their respective needs and utilization. These specialized needs are dependent on certain professions and needs, e.g. a psychiatrist who needs certain sounds for therapies and treatments on a mental level, and patients who have conditions such as insomnia, anxiety and tinnitus (these conditions are managed with special devices which are designed to create certain sounds that treat such conditions at a mental level). A white noise machine has “white” as the color code given to that noise having a particular frequency spectrum.

=== Audio jammers ===
White noise machines are used to diminish the potential for recording or overhearing conversations. Republican Glen Casada had a white noise machine installed in his office to prevent against eavesdropping.

Smart speaker blockers have been developed. For example, Bracelet of Silence is a bracelet that outputs white noise to protect privacy against digital recording from smart speakers. Bracelet of Silence is portable and not attached to smart speakers, thus it is possible that this device can be used to prevent eavesdropping of other devices as well, for example smartphones and laptops.

There is not a lot of research on the impact of loud sounds at inaudible frequencies (and their respective audible artifacts and harmonics).

== Design ==
Most modern white noise generators are electronic, usually generating the sound in real-time with audio test equipment, or via electronic playback of a digital audio recording. Simple mechanical machines consist of a very basic setup, involving an enclosed fan and, optionally, a speed switch. This fan drives air through small slots in the machine's casing, producing the desired sound. The first fan-based white noise machine was the Marpac Dohm, which was invented in 1962 and is frequently credited as the original domestic use white noise machine.

== Risk ==
One paper found that of the 14 white noise machines tested at maximum volume, all exceeded maximum safe sound levels for infants (50 dB). Three exceeded safe levels for adults (85 dB).

== See also ==
- Pink noise
- White noise
- Colors of noise
- Sound masking
- Tinnitus masker
- Sound Princess
