= National Action Plan =

A National Action Plan is a nationwide initiative which sets out proposed work in a certain area, such as:

- National Action Plan (Pakistan), a plan for combating terrorism
- National Action Plan for Children, a child welfare plan in various countries
- National Action Plan for Climate Change, an environmental plan in India
- National Action Plan for Salinity and Water Quality in Australia, run by the National Heritage Trust
- National Action Plan on Climate Change, an environmental plan in China
- National Action Plan on the Elimination of Child Labour, a child welfare plan in various countries
- National Action Plan to Combat Human Trafficking, in Canada
- National Renewable Energy Action Plan, a framework set out by the European Commission for energy conservation

== See also ==
- Action plan
- NAP (disambiguation)
