= Naps =

Naps or NAPS may refer to:

- Napolitains, small pieces of chocolate
- Naparima College, Trinidad and Tobago
- Naps (rapper) (born 1991), French rapper of Algerian descent
- NAPS team, an Italian software house based in Messina, Sicily

Abbreviations

- Narora Atomic Power Station
- Nishnawbe-Aski Police Service, First Nations agency, Canada

== See also ==
- Nap (disambiguation), also includes NAP
- Cleveland Guardians, baseball team, formerly Cleveland Naps
- Nissan NAPS (Nissan Anti Pollution System)
