= Nape (Lesbos) =

Coordinates: 39°15′10″N 26°14′36″E

Nape (Ancient Greek: Νάπη) was a town of ancient Lesbos.

The site of Nape is tentatively located near modern Klopedi.

Suda mention the Napaian Apollo (Ἀπόλλων Ναπαῖος).
