= James Maas =

American social psychologist and academic (1938–2025)

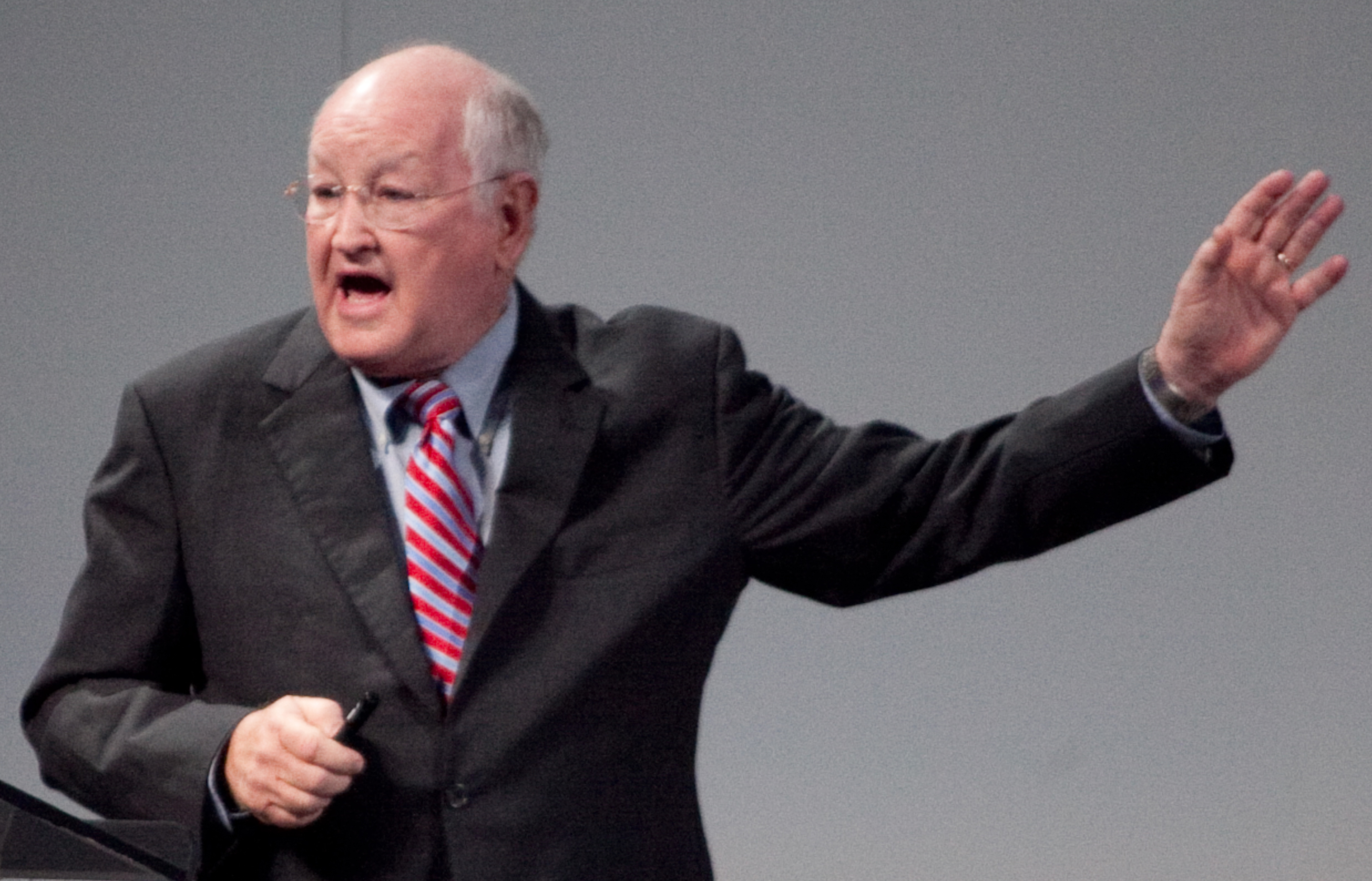
Maas in 2010

James Beryl Maas (August 9, 1938 – June 23, 2025) was an American social psychologist and academic who was best known for his work in the field of sleep research, specifically the relationship between sleep and performance. He was best known for coining the term "power nap". He held a B.A. from Williams College and an M.A. and Ph.D. from Cornell University. Maas also produced numerous film specials on sleep research for PBS, BBC, and others.

For 48 years, Maas taught psychology as a professor at Cornell University. His introductory course Psychology 101 was long known as the most popular class at Cornell. In Fall 1972, for instance, it had an enrollment of 993 students. In subsequent years the number would approach 1,600. The course was taught in the historic auditorium Bailey Hall, which while not ideal as a classroom was the only venue on campus large enough to host a lecture of that size. Maas used personal anecdotes, slides and videos, and exercises and games in order to communicate with the large audience. A profile in the New York Times described the course as having attained a "near-mythical status". Maas was named a Stephen H. Weiss Presidential Fellow at the university.

In January 1995, a Cornell University ethics committee recommended sanctions against Maas for sexual harassment. After the college's Senior Sexual Harassment Counselor determined that the complaints against plaintiff had merit, hearings were held before the college's Professional Ethics Committee. On June 23, 1995, the Cornell University Administration published a press release that found Maas had neither sought "an intimate sexual relationship with any of his students nor...engaged in the physically abusive behaviors often associated with the term 'sexual harassment.'"

The popularity of his course undiminished, Maas continued as a distinguished professor until his retirement on December 31, 2011. By his count, he had taught Psychology 101 to some 65,000 students. He served on the advisory board of American Sleep Association.

Maas authored the book Power Sleep: The Revolutionary Program That Prepares Your Mind for Peak Performance, with his research assistants Megan L. Wherry, David J. Axelrod, Jennifer A. Blumin and Barbara R. Hogan. He wrote in the book that "the process of sleep, if given adequate time and the proper environment, provides tremendous power ... It restores, rejuvenates, and energizes the body and brain.”

Maas died on June 23, 2025, at the age of 86.
