= Isaac Nape =

South African researcher and lecturer

Isaac Nape is a South African researcher and lecturer at the University of the Witwatersrand in Johannesburg, South Africa. He has contributed to the field of quantum science.

== Education ==
Nape completed his high school at Randfontein High School, and obtained his B.Sc Physics at the University of Pretoria in 2014. He further obtained his M.sc and PhD at the University of the Witwatersrand.

== Publications ==
- Harnessing optical aberrations for mode sorting
- Complex light for simulating quantum computing algorithms using reconfigurable optical vector-matrix multiplication
- Quantum searching algorithms using entangled structured light
- Self-learning photonic matrix multiplier
- Stokes reconstruction of chiral fields

== Recognition ==
Isaac has been recognized for various awards like the Silver Jubilee Medal from the South African Institute of Physics in 2023, the Emerging Leader Award from the South African Quantum Initiative.
