= Sara Mednick =

American neuroscientist

Sara C. Mednick is a sleep researcher at the University of California, Irvine. Her research focuses on the relationship between napping and performance. She is the author of several papers and a mass market book, Take a Nap! Change Your Life. She graduated with her PhD in psychology from Harvard University studying under Ken Nakayama and Robert Stickgold.

Mednick contends that humans have a biological need for an afternoon nap. "There's actually biological dips in our rhythm and in our alertness that seem to go along with the natural state of the way we used to be, probably from way back when we were allowed to nap more regularly," she told Diane Sawyer on Good Morning America.

"There is something very specific about the timing of the nap," she is quoted as saying in The Times (London). "It should be at about 2pm or 3pm. It's the time when most humans and animals experience what is called a post-prandial dip or low ebb. It's a dip in cogno-processing and physiological responses, when a lot of us actually do feel sleepy."

Coffee is an inferior substitute, Mednick believes. "In all of my research, what I found is that when I have people not drink caffeine but take a nap instead, they actually perform much better on a wide range of memory tasks," she told Neal Conan on NPR's Talk of the Nation. A video of her short Science Network lecture on nap research, at the Salk Institute in February 2007, can be viewed online.

Journalist Gregg Easterbrook named Dr. Mednick "2008 Tuesday Morning Quarterback Person of the Year", (although this doesn't appear to be an official award of any kind), citing her work to improve people's lives through napping:

"Mednick has produced scientific proof that people ought to take afternoon naps. Her latest study, published in the technical journal "Behavioural Brain Research," is in my opinion irrefutable. Naps, she found, improve cognitive performance better than caffeine and better than placebos -- and ... for even the most expensive medical intervention, to exceed the effectiveness of a placebo is quite impressive. Mednick is now campaigning for naps and even engaged in corporate nap consulting -- there's a 21st century field! She believes companies that allow employees to nap will realize improved productivity in the same number of work hours, a proposition that makes intuitive sense to me. Modern globalized life grows ever more stressful; the only sane response may be to take a nap. While most people who gain notoriety have caused harm to others, Sara Mednick is working to make our lives better, and for this she is the 2008 Tuesday Morning Quarterback Person of the Year."
