= Nap =

Short period of sleep during typical waking hours

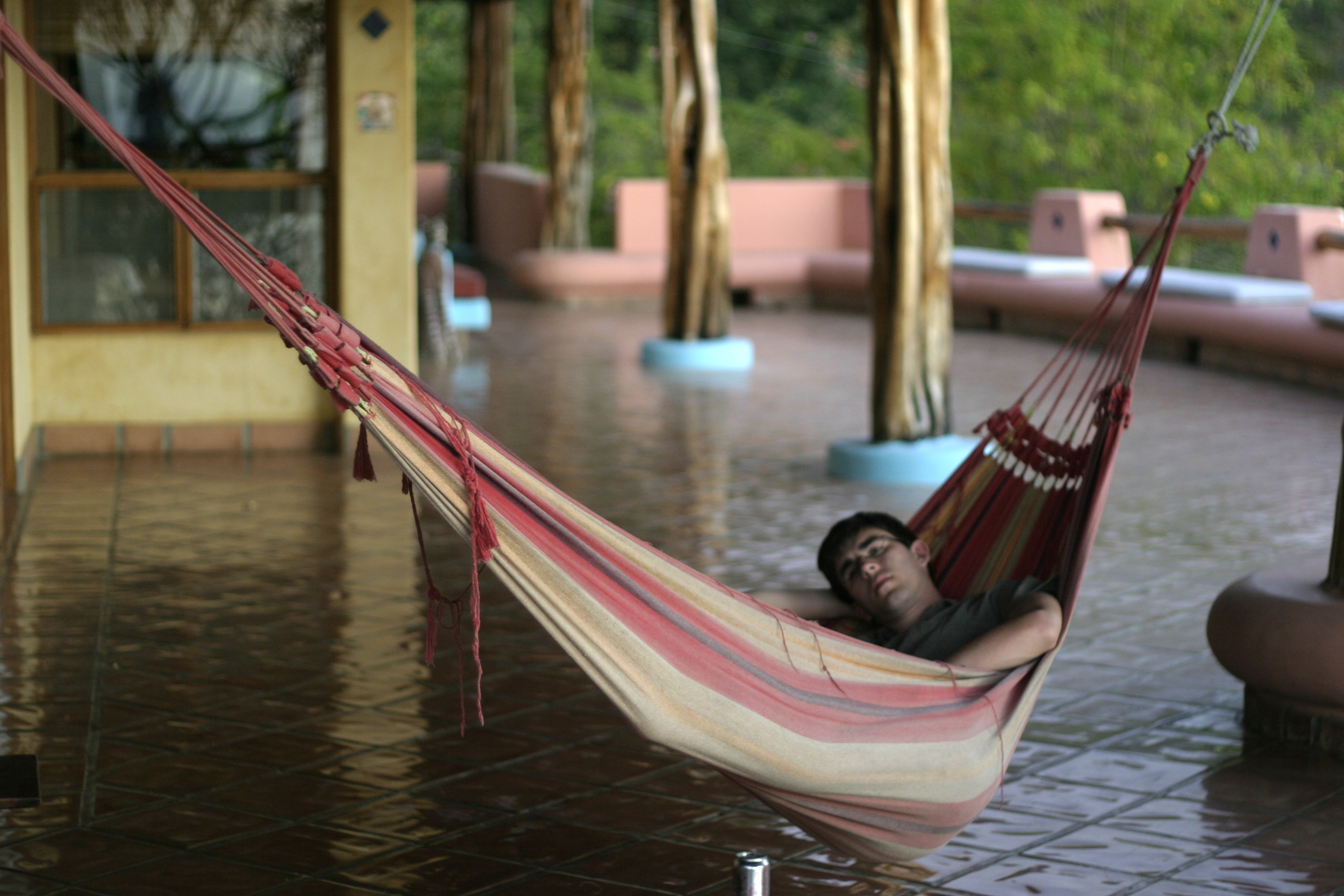
A man napping in a hammock, on a patio in Costa Rica

A nap is a short period of sleep, typically taken during daytime hours as an adjunct to the usual nocturnal sleep period. Naps are most often taken as a response to drowsiness during waking hours or as a means to supplement before or after loss of sleep. A nap is a form of biphasic or polyphasic sleep, where the latter terms also include longer periods of sleep in addition to one period. There are multiple different types of naps depending on what the user's desired outcome may be or time constraints they may have, and for years, scientists have been investigating the benefits of napping, including the 30-minute nap as well as sleep durations of 1–2 hours. Performance across a wide range of cognitive processes has been tested, and naps have been shown to have various cognitive, physical, and psychosocial benefits.

== Types of naps ==
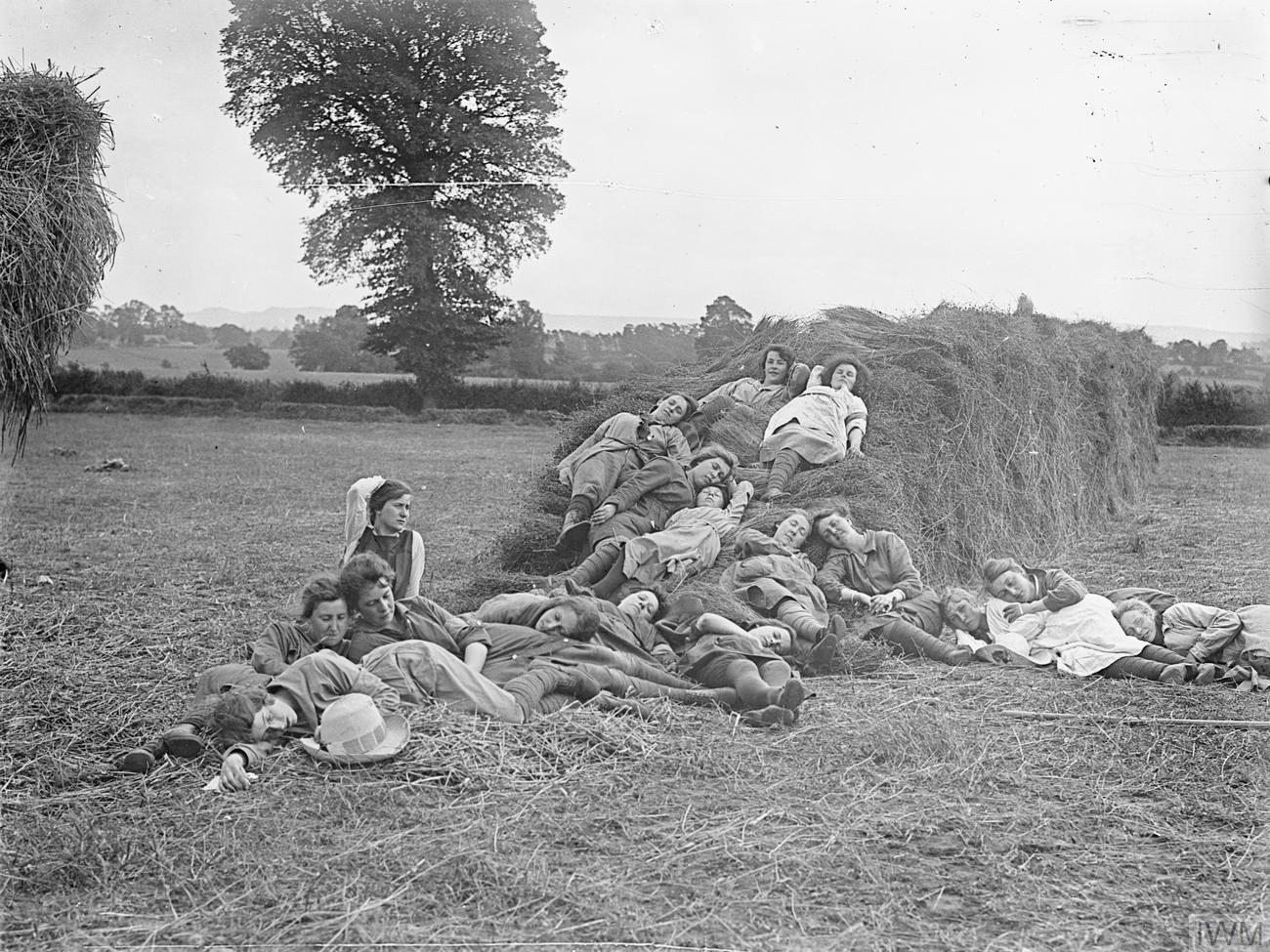
Agricultural workers napping on the flax they harvested

Naps can be categorized based on their purpose and duration.

=== Purpose classifications ===
- Power nap: A short nap designed to rejuvenate the individual quickly without entering deep sleep stages, thereby minimizing sleep inertia.
- Recovery nap: Taken to compensate for sleep loss that has already occurred, these naps help alleviate fatigue resulting from insufficient nocturnal sleep.
- Prophylactic nap: Planned in anticipation of sleep deprivation, such as before extended work hours or night shifts, to maintain alertness and performance.
- Safety nap: Scheduled by professionals such as firefighters, pilots, truck drivers, and healthcare workers to reduce the risk of errors or accidents, and often institutionally or legally mandated as part of one's workload.
- Appetitive nap: Napping for enjoyment or relaxation, even when not sleep-deprived.
- Habitual nap: Naps taken as part of a daily routine rather than as a response to fatigue or deprivation. Common in cultures that practice siestas, or among age groups like young children and older adults.
- Caffeine nap: A nap taken soon after consuming caffeine or coffee to take advantage of the delayed caffeine absorption to even more enhance focus and alertness upon waking.
- Essential nap: During times of illness or when in need of recovery, essential naps are taken to support healing and boost the immune system.

=== Duration classifications ===
Napping practices can be categorized based on duration, each offering distinct benefits and considerations:

1. Micro nap (2–5 minutes): Extremely short naps lasting 2 to 5 minutes can enhance alertness and reduce fatigue while staying in the light sleep stages. Micro naps should not be confused with microsleeps, which are short lapses in wakefulness that occur while a person is attempting to stay awake and can be dangerous for the individual and people around them if not addressed quickly.
2. Power nap (10–30 minutes): Power naps typically last between 10 and 30 minutes and are designed to improve alertness and performance without the grogginess associated with deeper sleep stages. The power nap is meant to maximize the benefits of sleep relative to time. It supplements normal sleep, especially when a sleeper has accumulated a sleep deficit. The greater the sleep deficit, the more effective the nap.
3. NASA nap (26 minutes): Based on research by NASA, a 26-minute nap has been shown to enhance alertness by 54% and performance by 34% among pilots and astronauts.
4. Slow-wave sleep nap (30–60 minutes): Naps lasting 30 to 60 minutes allow the body to enter slow-wave sleep, which is beneficial for decision-making skills and memorization. However, waking up during this phase may result in increased sleep inertia.
5. Full sleep cycle nap (90 minutes): A 90-minute nap typically encompasses a full sleep cycle, including light sleep, deep sleep, and REM sleep. This duration can enhance procedural memory and creativity and usually avoids sleep inertia, as the napper completes the full cycle.

== Benefits to napping ==
=== Learning and memory ===
Research suggests that shorter, habitual naps after instruction offer the most benefits to learning. The benefits to alertness show no change based on duration of the nap for combating post-lunch dip, even for naps as short as 10 minutes. Napping enhances alertness in young adults and adolescents during afternoons' performances, which affect efficiency. Additionally, pre-teens who nap regularly during the day demonstrate better sleep at night. In younger children, napping increased drowsiness even while improving memory recall.

For students of all ages, napping during the school day showed benefits to reaction time and recall of declarative memory of new information, especially if the naps remain in slow-wave sleep, i.e. less than an hour in length.

Some studies have shown that a 60–90-minute nap can be more effective than caffeine alone for memory and cognition.

=== Cognitive capacity ===
In adults, a causal association has been found between habitual daytime napping and larger brain volume. Brain volume normally declines with age, and is associated with neurodegenerative disease. Earlier studies have shown benefits of napping for cognitive performance for healthy adults.

=== Alertness and fatigue ===
The circadian cycle plays a role in the rising demand for daytime naps: sleepiness rises towards the mid-afternoon, hence the best timing for naps is early afternoon. Twenty- to thirty-minute naps are recommended for adults, while young children and elderly people may need longer naps. Research, on the other hand, has shown that the benefits of napping depend on sleep onset and sleep phases rather than time and duration.

=== Prescribed napping ===
It has been shown that excessive daytime sleepiness (EDS) can be improved by prescribed napping in narcolepsy. Apart from narcolepsy, it has not been demonstrated that naps are beneficial for EDS in other sleep disorders. For idiopathic hypersomnia, patients typically experience sleep inertia and are unrefreshed after napping.

For healthy individuals in need of cognitive or emotional improvement, prescribed naps may be beneficial. However, excessive napping, especially in adults with other health conditions, may be linked with negative outcomes and should be approached holistically and with caution.

== Negative effects of napping ==
=== Sleep inertia ===
The state of grogginess, impaired cognition and disorientation experienced when awakening from sleep is known as sleep inertia. This state reduces the speed of cognitive tasks but has no effects on the accuracy of task performance. The effects of sleep inertia rarely last longer than 30 minutes in the absence of prior sleep deprivation.

=== Potential health risks ===
A 2016 meta-analysis showed that there may be a correlation between habitual napping for more than an hour, and having an increased risk for cardiovascular disease, diabetes, metabolic syndrome or death. There was no effect of napping for as long as 40 minutes per day, but a sharp increase in risk of disease occurred at longer nap times. No causal relationship was established: the link may be to do with people taking a longer nap in response to the pre-existence of other risk factors.

Habitual naps are also an indicator of neurological degradation such as dementia in the elderly, as reduction in brain function causes more sleepiness.

== Naps across the lifespan ==
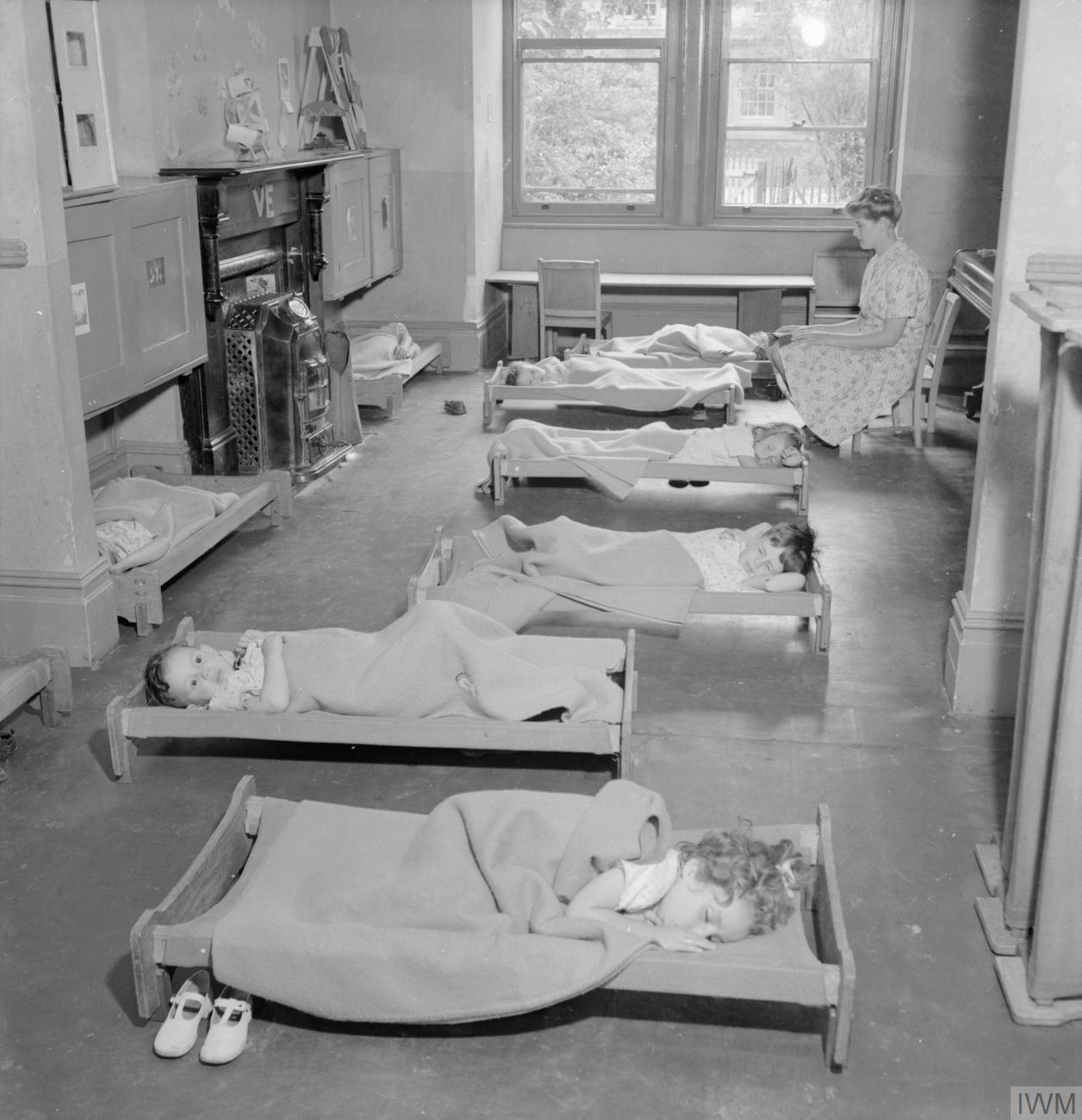
Naptime in a nursery, 1945

The need and benefits of napping vary across different age groups since sleep patterns and requirements across a person's lifespan vary with time.

- Infants and young children: Regular naps are crucial for growth, development, and mood regulation. They contribute significantly to memory consolidation and learning processes.
- Adolescents: Napping can improve mood, alertness, and academic performance, especially when nighttime sleep is insufficient. Some research suggests that the biological changes marked by puberty in adolescents are highly correlated to a later sleep onset time, lower sleep efficiency, and other sleep pattern changes that might point to why adolescents, especially older adolescents, may require more naps.
- Adults: Short naps can enhance cognitive functions, mood, and alertness. However, longer naps may lead to sleep inertia and could be associated with health risks if they disrupt nighttime sleep. Adults requiring frequent daytime naps might have underlying sleep conditions, such as sleep apnea, that might need medical attention.
- Older adults: As sleep efficiency decreases with age, sleep patterns in older adults may shift towards napping more frequently to maintain performance without detriment to nocturnal sleep. Evidence shows that older adults with chronic health conditions may take naps to offset fatigue from their comorbidities rather than fatigue based solely on their age.

== Best practices ==
How long and when a person naps affects sleep inertia and sleep latency: a person is more likely to benefit in terms of those two points when they sleep moderately in the afternoon. According to research, the degree to which a person experiences sleep inertia differs in different durations of nap. Because sleep inertia possibly results from awakening from slow-wave sleep, it is more likely to happen when one has a longer nap. Sleep inertia is less intense after short naps. Sleep latency is shorter when a nap is taken between 3 and 5 pm, compared with a nap taken between 7 and 9 pm.

According to The Sleep Foundation, Psychology Today and Harvard Health Publishing, these are the best practices for napping:

- Setting up a sleep-friendly environment
  - Dark room
  - Quiet atmosphere
  - Only using the bed for sleep
  - Limiting electronic use prior to sleep
- Understanding physical needs
- Setting an alarm in order to prevent the negative impact of sleep inertia and sleep latency

== See also ==
- Siesta – a short nap in the early afternoon, often after the midday meal
- Sleep hygiene
- Microsleep
- Power nap
