= Teresa Paiva =

Portuguese neurologist and somnologist

- Born: 1945 (age 80–81); Lisbon, Portugal
- Occupation: Somnologist
- Years active: 45
- Website: ;

Teresa Paiva is a Portuguese somnologist, neurologist, academic and author. She was the head of neurology department at the Hospital de Santa Maria in Lisbon and is clinical director of the Sleep Medicine Center in Lisbon.

== Training ==
Teresa Paiva was born in the Portuguese capital of Lisbon in 1945. She graduated in medicine from the Faculty of Medicine at the University of Lisbon in 1969. She obtained a doctorate degree in neurology and neurophysiology from the same university in 1977, having done an internship at the "TNO Institute of Medical Physics" in Utrecht, Netherlands. Since then, her career has concentrated on diseases related to sleep. She is recognised by the Portuguese Medical Association as having competence in neurology, neurophysiology and sleep medicine. In 2012, she was appointed a "European Somnologist" by the European Sleep Research Society.

== Career ==
From 1970, Paiva worked in various capacities at the Hospital de Santa Maria in Lisbon. She was the neurology department head since 1994, and retired from her post in 2006. In 1976, she set up and ran the hospital's headache clinic, the first of its kind in Portugal. From 1980, she was the head of the hospital's electroencephalography (EEG) unit. After 7 years, she also set up the hospital’s sleep consultation unit, having previously been involved with sleep consultation at the Centro de Estudos Egas Moniz, part of the University of Lisbon medicine faculty, where she introduced polysomnography.

Paiva has been the clinical director of the Centro de Electroencefalografia e Neurofisiologia Clínica, more commonly known as the Sleep Medicine Center (CENC), in Lisbon since 1983. She continues to collaborate with the University of Lisbon, coordinating the master's course in sleep sciences from 2005 to 2012 She was an invited professor of the biomedical engineering course of the Instituto Superior Técnico of the university between 2003 and 2016 and continues to collaborate in the doctoral programme on environmental health. In her career she has coordinated 18 national or international scientific projects and six clinical trials.

Paiva was a founder of the Portuguese Sleep Association in 1993. She is a member of the board of the International Pediatric Sleep Association.

== Publications ==
Paiva has authored or co-authored over 145 peer-reviewed articles and is editor or co-editor of 13 books and 70 book chapters. In addition to technical publications, she has also authored books on sleep that have a more general appeal.

- Teresa Paiva. 2015. Bom Sono, Boa Vida (Good Sleep, Good Life) takes the view that it is possible and essential to sleep better and provides advice on how to achieve this.
- Teresa Paiva & Helena Rebelo Pinto (ill. Danuta Wojciechowska). 2014. Dormir é Bom, Dormir Faz Bem (Sleep is good, sleep makes you well) is a book aimed at young children.
- Teresa Paiva & Thomas Penzel. 2011. Centro de Medicina do Sono - Manual Prático (Sleep Medicine Center—Practical Manual) is designed to provide advice to medical practitioners and students.
