= Board of Registered Polysomnographic Technologists =

The Board of Registered Polysomnographic Technologists (BRPT) maintains credentialing for polysomnographic technologists. It offers two credentials, the registered and certified polysomnographic technologist credentials (the RPSGT and the CPSGT). The BRPT is located at: 8400 Westport Drive, 2nd Floor, McLean, Virginia 22102. The BRPT was established in 1978 and offered the first RPSGT exam in 1979.

== Tasks of the BRPT ==
One of the main tasks of the BRPT is the administration of the RPSGT and CPSGT exams. Although other credentialing options now exist, the RPSGT credential was the only one in existence for many years. The actual testing for these exams is done at Pearson Vue testing centers. For more information about these credentials, please see the polysomnographic technician article.

The BRPT, through its website, conducts much other work. Those holding the RPSGT and CPSGT credential must obtain continuing education credits (CECs) to maintain their status, although the RPSGT holders may opt to retest rather than earn CECs. The BRPT website allows credential holders to enter information on the CECs they earn and this enables the BRPT to evaluate and renew the RPSGT credential. The BRPT offers no or very few CECs. Organizations that provide large numbers of CECs include the American Association of Sleep Technologists (AAST) and the American Association for Respiratory Care (AARC).

The BRPT website also provides job and career information and it maintains a list of accredited polysomnography programs.

== Accreditation of the BRPT ==
The BRPT is a member of the Institution for Credentialing Excellence (ICE). The RPSGT credential is accredited by the National Commission for Certifying Agencies (NCCA).

== Online forums where BRPT is discussed ==
In addition to the BRPT being discussed on the AAST website, two other organizations have online forums concerning the BRPT. Binary Sleep has a forum in which issues revolving around the BRPT are discussed. Sleepnet.com is a website that has discussions concerning the RPSGT exam on its Tech Forums.
