= Somnology =

Scientific study of sleep

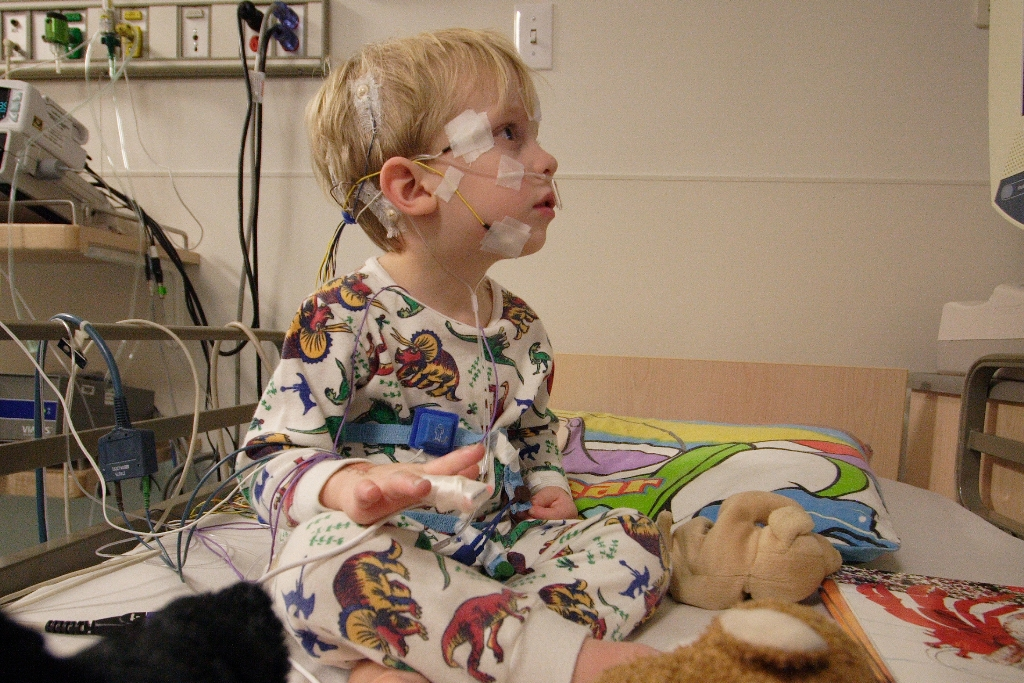
Pediatric polysomnography patient, Children's Hospital (Saint Louis), 2006

Somnology is the scientific study of sleep. It includes clinical study and treatment of sleep disorders and irregularities. Sleep medicine is a subset of somnology. Hypnology has a similar meaning but includes hypnotic phenomena.

== History ==
After the invention of the EEG, the stages of sleep were determined in 1936 by Harvey and Loomis, the first descriptions of delta and theta waves were made by Walter and Dovey, and REM sleep was discovered in 1953. Sleep apnea was identified in 1965. In 1970, the first clinical sleep laboratory was developed at Stanford. The first actigraphy device was made in 1978 by Krupke, and continuous positive airway pressure therapy and uvulopalatopharyngoplasty were created in 1981.

The Examination Committee of the Association of Sleep Disorders Centers, which is now the American Academy of Sleep Medicine, was established in 1978 and administered the sleep administration test until 1990. In 1989, the American Board of Sleep Medicine was created to administer the tests and eventually assumed all the duties of the Examination committee in 1991. In the United States, the American Board of Sleep Medicine grants certification for sleep medicine to both physicians and non-physicians. However, the board does not allow one to practice sleep medicine without a medical license.

== The International Classification of Sleep Disorders ==
Created in 1990 by the American Academy of Sleep Medicine (with assistance from European Sleep Research Society, the Japanese Society of Sleep Research, and the Latin American Sleep Society), the International Classification of Sleep Disorders is the primary reference for scientists and diagnosticians. Sleep disorders are separated into four distinct categories: parasomnias; dyssomnias; sleep disorders associated with mental, neurological, or other medical conditions; and sleep disorders that do not have enough data available to be counted as definitive sleep disorders. The ICSD has created a comprehensive description for each sleep disorder with the following information.

- Synonyms and Key Words – This section describes the terms and phrases used to describe the disorder and also includes an explanation on the preferred name of the disorder when appropriate.
- Essential Features – This section describes the main symptoms and features of the disorder.
- Associated Features – This section describes the features that appear often but not always present. Furthermore, complications that are caused directly by the disorder are listed here.
- Course – This section describes the clinical course and the outcome of an untreated disorder.
- Predisposing Factors – This section describes internal and external factors that increase the chances of a patient developing the sleep disorder.
- Prevalence – This section, if known, describes the proportion of people who have or had this disorder.
- Age of Onset – This section describes the age range when the clinical features first appear.
- Sex Ratio – This section describes the relative frequency that the disorder is diagnosed in each sex.
- Familial Pattern – This section describes whether the disorder is found among family members.
- Pathology – This section describes the microscopic pathologic features of the disorder. If this is not known, the pathology of the disorder is described instead.
- Complications – This section describes any possible disorders or complications that can occur because of the disease.
- Polysomnographic Features – This section describes how the disorder appears under a polysomnograph.
- Other Laboratory Features - This section describes other laboratory test such as blood tests and brain imaging.
- Differential Diagnosis – This section describes disorders with similar symptoms.
- Diagnostic Criteria – This section has the criteria that can make a clear-cut diagnosis.
- Minimal Criteria – This section is used for general clinical practice and is used to make a provisional diagnosis.
- Severity Criteria – This section has a three-part classification into “mild,” “moderate,” and “severe” and also describes the criteria for the severity.
- Duration Criteria – This section allows a clinician to determine how long a disorder has been present and separates the durations into “acute,” “subacute,” and “chronic.
- Bibliography – This section contains the references.

== Diagnostic tools ==
Somnologists employ various diagnostic tools to determine the nature of a sleep disorder or irregularity. Some of these tools can be subjective such as the sleep diaries or the sleep questionnaire. Other diagnostic tools are used while the patient is asleep such as the polysomnograph and actigraphy.

=== Sleep diaries ===
A sleep diary is a daily log made by the patient that contains information about the quality and quantity of sleep. The information includes sleep onset time, sleep latency, number of awakenings in a night, time in bed, daytime napping, sleep quality assessment, use of hypnotic agents, use of alcohol and cigarettes, and unusual events which may influence a person's sleep. Such a log is usually made for one or two weeks before visiting a somnologist. The sleep diary may be used in conjunction with actigraphy.

=== Sleep questionnaires ===
Sleep questionnaires help determine the presence of a sleep disorder by asking a patient to fill out a questionnaire about a certain aspect of their sleep such as daytime sleepiness. These questionnaires include the Epworth Sleepiness Scale, the Stanford Sleepiness Scale, and the Sleep Timing Questionnaire.

The Epworth Sleepiness Scale measures general sleep propensity and asks the patient to rate their chances of dozing off in eight different situations. The Stanford Sleepiness Scale asks the patient to note their perception of sleepiness by using a seven-point test. The Sleep Timing Questionnaire is a 10-minute self-administration test that can be used in place of a 2-week sleep diary. The questionnaire can be a valid determinate of sleep parameters such as bed time, wake time, sleep latency, and wake after sleep onset.

=== Actigraphy ===
Actigraphy can assess sleep/wake patterns without confining one to the laboratory. The monitors are small, wrist-worn movement monitors that can record activity for up to several weeks. Sleep and wakefulness are determined by using an algorithm that analyzes the movement of the patient and the input of bed and wake times from a sleep diary.

=== Physical examination ===
A physical examination can determine the presence of other medical conditions that can cause a sleep disorder.

=== Polysomnography ===
Polysomnography involves the continuous monitoring of multiple physiological variables during sleep. These variables include electroencephalography, electrooculography, electromyography, and electrocardiography as well as airflow, oxygenation, and ventilation measurements. Electroencephalography measures the voltage activity of neuronal somas and dendrites within the cortex, electro-oculography measures the potential between cornea and retina, electromyography is used to identify REM sleep by measuring the electrical potential of skeletal muscle, and electrocardiography measures cardiac rate and rhythm. It is important to point out that EEG, in particular, always refers to a collective of neurons firing as EEG equipment is not sensitive enough to measure a single neuron.

==== Airflow measurements ====
Airflow measurement can be used to indirectly determine the presence of an apnea; measurements are taken by pneumotachography, nasal pressure, thermal sensors, and expired carbon dioxide. Pneumotachography measures the difference in pressure between inhalation and exhalation, nasal pressure can help determine the presence of airflow similar to pneumotachography, thermal sensors detect the difference in temperature between inhaled and exhaled air, and expired carbon dioxide monitoring detect the difference in carbon dioxide between inhaled and exhaled air.

==== Oxygenation and ventilation measurements ====
The monitoring of oxygenation and ventilation is important in the assessment of sleep-related breathing disorders. However, because oxygen values can change often during the course of sleep, repeated measurements must be taken to ensure accuracy. The direct measurements of arterial oxygen tension only offer a static glimpse, and repeated measurements from invasive procedures such as sampling arterial blood for oxygen will disturb the patient's sleep; therefore, noninvasive methods are preferred such as pulse oximetry, transcutaneous oxygen monitoring, transcutaneous carbon dioxide, and pulse transit time.

Pulse oximetry measures the oxygenation in peripheral capillaries (such as the fingers); however, an article written by Bohning states that pulse oximetry may be imprecise for use in diagnosing obstructive sleep-apnea, due to the differences in signal processing in the devices.

Transcutaneous oxygen and carbon dioxide monitoring measure the oxygen and carbon dioxide tension on the skin surface respectively, and the pulse transit time measures the transmission time of an arterial pulse transit wave. For the lattermost, pulse transit time increases when one is aroused from sleep, making it useful in determining sleep apnea.

=== Snoring ===
Snoring can be detected by a microphone and may be a symptom of obstructive sleep-apnea.

=== Multiple Sleep Latency Test ===
The Multiple Sleep Latency Test (MSLT) measures a person's physiological tendency to fall asleep during a quiet period in terms of sleep latency, the amount of time it takes for someone. An MSLT is normally performed after a nocturnal polysomnography to ensure both an adequate duration of sleep and to exclude other sleep disorders.

=== Maintenance of Wakefulness Test ===
The Maintenance of Wakefulness Test (MWT) measures a person's ability to stay awake for a certain period of time, essentially measuring the time one can stay awake during the day. The test isolates a person from factors that can influence sleep such as temperature, light, and noise. Furthermore, the patient is also highly suggested to not take any hypnotics, drink alcohol, or smoke before or during the test. After allowing the patient to lie down on the bed, the time between lying down and falling asleep is measured and used to determine one's daytime sleepiness.

== Treatments ==
Though somnology does not necessarily mean sleep medicine, somnologists can use behavioral, mechanical, or pharmacological means to correct a sleep disorder.

=== Behavioral treatments ===
Behavioral treatments tend to be the most prescribed and the most cost-efficient of all treatments; these treatments include exercise, cognitive behavioral therapy, relaxation therapy, meditation, and improving sleep hygiene. Improving sleep hygiene includes making the patient sleep regularly, discourage the patient from taking daytime naps, or suggesting they sleep in a different position.

=== Mechanical treatments ===
Mechanical treatments are primarily used to reduce or eliminate snoring and can be either invasive or non-invasive. Surgical procedures for treating snoring include palatal stiffening techniques, uvulopalatopharyngoplasty and uvulectomy while non-invasive procedures include continuous positive airway pressure, mandibular advancement splints, and tongue-retaining devices.

=== Pharmacological treatments ===
Pharmacological treatments are used to chemically treat sleep disturbances such as insomnia or excessive daytime sleepiness. The kinds of drugs used to treat sleep disorders include: anticonvulsants, anti-narcoleptics, anti-Parkinsonian drugs, benzodiazepines, non-benzodiazepine hypnotics, and opiates as well as the hormone melatonin and melatonin receptor agonists. Anticonvulsants, opioids, and anti-Parkinsonian drugs are often used to treat restless legs syndrome. Furthermore, melatonin, benzodiazepines hypnotics, and non-benzodiazepine hypnotics may be used to treat insomnia. Finally, anti-narcoleptics help treat narcolepsy and excessive daytime sleepiness.

Of particular interest are the benzodiazepine drugs which reduce insomnia by increasing the efficiency of GABA. GABA decreases the excitability of neurons by increasing the firing threshold. Benzodiazepine causes the GABA receptor to better bind to GABA, allowing the medication to induce sleep.

Generally, these treatments are given after the behavioral treatment has failed. Drugs such as tranquilizers, though they may work well in treating insomnia, have a risk of abuse which is why these treatments are not the first resort. Some sleep disorders such as narcolepsy do require pharmacological treatment.

== See also ==
- Sleep disorder
- Sleep medicine
- Snoring
