= Mikhail Semyonovich Shoyfet =

Austrian writer and hypnotist

Shoyfet, Mikhail Semyonovich (born August 26, 1947, in Vienna, Austria - died October 22, 2013, in Germany) was a hypnotherapist, hypnotist and author of an original method of psychophysical self-regulation. Journalist, member of the Union of Journalists of Moscow and Russia. Writer, author of the books “Training of psychophysical self-regulation”, 2003 («Тренинг психофизической саморегуляции», 2003), “One Hundred Great Doctors, 2004, 2005, 2006, 2008 («Сто Великих Врачей», 2004, 2005, 2006, 2008), “Undiscovered Secrets of Hypnosis”, 2006 («Нераскрытые тайны гипноза», 2006), “Hypnosis: Criminals and Victims”, 2010 («Гипноз: преступники и жертвы», 2010), “Psychophysical self-regulation. Big modern practical course”, 2010 («Психофизическая саморегуляция. Большой современный практикум», 2010), "Mediums and spirits" (2011), as well as multiple publications on history and practice of hypnosis, a subset of physiology of elevated neural function.

M. Shoyfet is a famous hypnotist, founder of pop-hypnotism (as performed in front of an audience) in Russia. Received wide recognition in Russia in the 1980s, thanks to stage performances of his well-known show “Theatre of Hypnosis” («Театр гипноза»)

== Biography ==
Born August 26, 1947, in Vienna, Austria on Belvederegasse street # 8, the house of Frau Brambauer. In 1980 he created Theatre of Hypnosis («Театр гипноза»), the first theatrical musical show featuring hypnosis in the Soviet Union. He performed the show from 1985 until 1992 at the Moscow Regional Philharmonic. On September 9, 1994, “Mikhail Shoyfet Theatre of Psychological Help”, LLC (ТОО «Театр Психологической Помощи Михаила Шойфета») was registered with the Moscow Region Registration Office. In the late 1990s taught at the Institute of Psychology of the Russian Academy of Sciences. From 2001 through 2003 authored a series of articles called “Learn Self-Control” («Учитесь властвовать собой») in a weekly publication “Arguments and Facts” (АиФ «Здоровье»)

Until 2013, M. Shoyfet lived in Germany (Jena, Thuringia) and was active in the literary, scientific and educational activities in the field of hypnology. He was also a passionate advocate of the hypnosuggestion method. M. Shoyfet died on October 22, 2013, after suffering thyroid cancer.

== Theatre of hypnosis ==
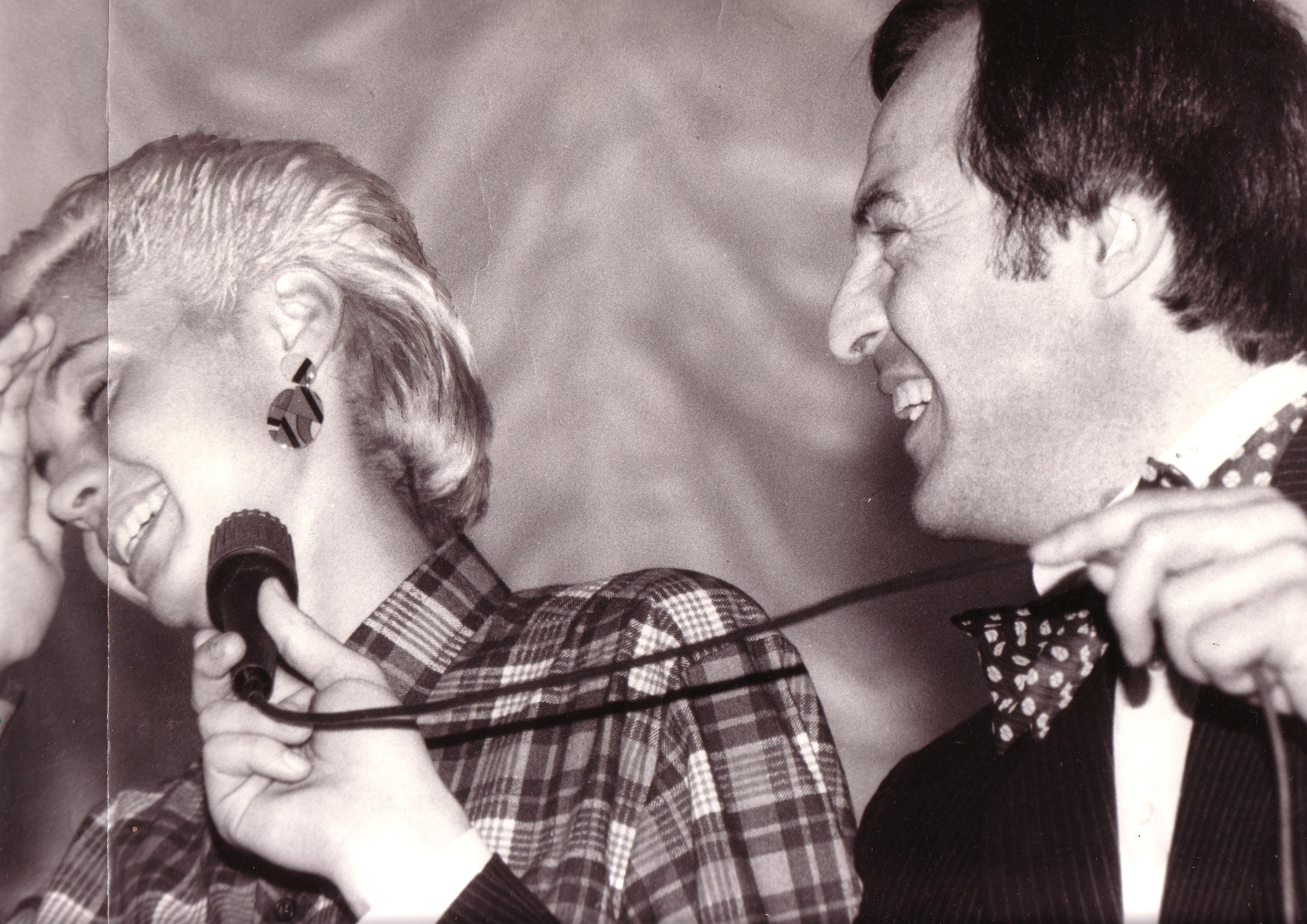
Scene from hypnosis theatre, MAI club 1989 year

Michail Shoyfet transformed hypnotist work to an art. Theatrical hypnosis sessions of M. Shoyfet enjoyed great popularity. Under the influence of hypnosis, people would begin to perform roles, suggested by Shoyfet. The number of participants occasionally reached three hundred people. According to press estimates, these were some of the largest demonstrations of hypnosis ever conducted. Performances could last up to five hours. In addition to the performance itself, Shoyfet would also conduct lectures and teach all performance participants how to conduct hypnosis on themselves. He also conducted training on the techniques of psychological self-programming, directed at improving creative, physical and other abilities.

According to press reports, participation in these sessions positively influenced the psyche of a person, allowing them to feel more liberated and gain confidence in themselves.

M.S. Shoyfet Theatre of Hypnosis performances were covered by the mainstream press many times, including television, weekly print publications “Semya” («Семья»), “Nedelya” («Неделя»), “Sobesednik” («Собеседник»), daily newspapers “Moscow Komsomolets” («Московский комсомолец»), “Komsomolskaya Pravda” («Комсомольская правда»), “Gudok” («Гудок»),”Rossiiskie Vesti” («Российские вести»), “Rossiiskaya Gazeta” («Российская газета»), and others.

== Career evaluations ==
The work of M.S. Shoyfet has received rather high marks from scientists. For instance, deputy director of Institute of Psychology of the Russian Academy of Sciences professor V. N. Druzhinin (В. Н. Дружинин), PhD Psyc., has highlighted his high achievements in popularizing hypnosis, in attracting the attention of the public to this phenomenon, calling him “a classic of Russian hypnosis”
