= American Board of Sleep Medicine =

- Company type: Non-profit organization
- Industry: Health care
- Headquarters: Darien, Illinois, United States
- Area served: Primarily the United States, but it serves the sleep medicine specialty worldwide
- Key people: Nathaniel F. Watson, MD, president
- Website: http://absm.org/

The American Board of Sleep Medicine (ABSM) is a nonprofit organization that certifies physicians, PhDs, specialists, and technologists in the specialty of sleep medicine. ABSM shares office space and at least some staff with the American Academy of Sleep Medicine (AASM) in Darien, Illinois, USA; the two organizations are closely related and serve basically the same constituency.

In the past, the ABSM has offered four distinct examinations:

- Sleep Medicine Specialty Certification Examination
- Behavioral Sleep Medicine Certification Examination
- Sleep Technologist Registry Examination
- Sleep Scoring Proficiency Examination

As of 2020 the ABSM still offers one examination:

- Registered Sleep Technologist Examination (RST)

The first two exams were offered mainly to physicians (MDs and DOs). However, non-physicians have taken and passed the exams. These have been mainly PhDs and DDSs. Therefore, the ABSM has put a disclaimer in its website cautioning everyone who has passed the exams to only practice medicine within the legal limits allowed. Those passing the Sleep Medicine Specialty Exam received the designation "diplomate of the ABSM." As of 2006 3,445 persons had been awarded this designation. As of 2007 the ABSM stopped administering this exam. Now member boards of the American Board of Medical Specialties offer specialty exams.

The third and fourth exams on the list are geared toward sleep technologists. The Sleep Scoring Proficiency Examination is intended for those interested in the taking the Sleep Technologist Registry Examination. The latter exam was implemented in August 2011. The credential awarded to the individual passing this exam is the Registered Sleep Technologist (RST) credential. The first persons awarded the RST were Registered Polysomnographic Technologists (RPSGTs) who met the criteria the ABSM set forth to bypass taking the exam. The first RST credentials were awarded in August 2011. By September 11, 2011, 975 RST credentials were awarded; ten days later 1,549 individuals held this credential.

The ABSM and the AASM have both been involved in promoting and explaining the rationale for the RST credential. Within the sleep community there has been much discussion and some disagreement about the launching of the RST credential when credentials already exist for the RPSGT (from the Board of Registered Polysomnographic Technologists (BRPT)) and the RRT-SDS and CRT-SDS (from the American Association of Sleep Technologists (AAST)). The July/August 2011 issue of Sleep Review magazine has an editorial and an article where the RST credential is discussed.
