= Polysomnographic technologist =

Health specialist profession

A polysomnographic technologist (formerly called a polysomnographic technician) performs overnight, daytime, or home sleep studies, polysomnograms, on people with suspected sleep disorders. In the United States and worldwide, the process for becoming a polysomnography technician or technologist is primarily either on-the-job or certificate based. There are associate level programs offered by for-profit schools that award a degree in polysomnography technology in the United States, though not necessary to attain employment with the same title. After an education program or adequate on-the-job training is complete, the student is eligible for credentialing by the Board of Registered Polysomnographic Technologists (BRPT), a non-profit credentialing agency based in the United States but serving polysomnographers worldwide. The BRPT maintains credentialing for over 35 countries including Canada and the United States as well as over 17,000 individuals working in the industry.

== Credentialing and licensure ==
=== Board of Registered Polysomnographic Technologists ===
==== Registered Polysomnographic Technologist ====
Registered Polysomnographic Technologist (RPSGT) is a certification awarded by the Board of Registered Polysomnographic Technologists in the US. The RPSGT credential certifies its holder is regarded by the BRPT as fully competent to work in the field of sleep studies. Most RPSGTs conduct sleep studies on patients. Some RPSGTs score sleep studies. Basically scoring a study means summarizing it, so it can be used by others involved in the sleep medicine field.

The RPSGT candidate may qualify for the credentialing examination by a variety of paths. Depending on the qualifying path taken, one must work for a minimum of six to eighteen months full-time in polysomnography to be eligible for the examination. As of December 2014 the BRPT listed over 21,000 holders of the RPSGT credential. The credential is valid for five years. To renew it, the holder must earn 50 continuing education credits (CECs) or retake the credentialing exam. Two major sources in the US for obtaining CECs are the American Association of Sleep Technologists (AAST) and the American Association for Respiratory Care (AARC).

==== Certified Polysomnographic Technician ====
In the US, certification is awarded by the Board of Registered Polysomnographic Technologists (BRPT). The CPSGT is considered a transitional certification. It is valid for only three years. By that time the CPSGT holder must earn the RPSGT certification, as the CPSGT cannot be renewed. To become a CPSGT, one must pass an examination. To be eligible for the exam, one must have worked full-time for three months in polysomnography and have taken the AASM A-STEP Self-Learning Modules. The AASM is the American Academy of Sleep Medicine.

To maintain the CPSGT, the holder must earn ten continuing education credits (CECs) per year. Major sources for obtaining CECs are the American Association of Sleep Technologists and the American Association for Respiratory Care.

=== American Board of Sleep Medicine ===
==== Registered Sleep Technologist ====
Registered sleep technologists (RST) are sleep specialists who have been granted the certification by the American Board of Sleep Medicine.

=== National Board for Respiratory Care ===
==== Registered Respiratory Therapist - Sleep Disorders Specialist ====
The National Board for Respiratory Care (NBRC) developed the Sleep Disorders Specialist (SDS) credential in 2007. The NBRC initiated this credential, in spite of the fact that the Registered Polysomnographic Technologist (RPSGT) credential was widely accepted in the field of sleep medicine. This initially caused conflict amongst various organizations in the sleep field. To earn the SDS credential, the applicant must first be a Certified Respiratory Therapist (CRT) or a Registered Respiratory Therapist (RRT). The CRT applicant must have six months experience in sleep studies and the RRT applicant must have three months in sleep studies. Both the CRT and RRT applicants must pass an examination. The holder of the SDS credential then appends this abbreviation to his CRT or RRT credential, thus becoming a CRT-SDS or RRT-SDS.

== See also ==
- Respiratory therapy
