= Clinophilia =

Sleep disorder

In medicine, clinophilia is a sleep disorder described as the tendency of a patient to remain in bed in a reclined position without sleeping for prolonged periods of time.

== Etymology and consequences ==
The word clinophilia means "liking to lie down" (from the Greek clino- 'lying down' and -philia 'love').

It is one of the first symptoms of depression or schizophrenia, but is not in itself a disease. Clinophiliacs generally experience feelings of isolation and repressed sadness.

== Description ==
This is a psychologically based disorder sometimes found in depression or certain forms of schizophrenia. Clinophiles generally feel lonely. Care must be taken not to confuse this disorder with true hypersomnia, since in the latter patients sleep genuinely and very deeply, whereas in clinophilia, the long sleep times patients may describe are not objectively present. In clinophilia, if patients complain of oversleeping, this is due to psychological problems and not to a physiological defect in the wake/sleep system, as in idiopathic hypersomnia or narcolepsy. Similarly, it should not be confused with dysania, which describes a difficulty in getting out of bed, whereas clinophilia does not describe an "impediment" to getting up, but rather a "willingness" to lie down.

Clinophilia can also accompany a post-fall syndrome as part of an overall psychomotor regression in the elderly. Although it can affect anyone, clinophilia seems to be more prevalent in women aged between 20 and 40 (particularly after major hormonal changes) and in the elderly.

== See also ==
- Bed rotting
