= Sleep medicine =

Medical specialty

- System: Respiratory system, cardiovascular system, nervous system
- Significant diseases: Insomnia, sleep apnoea, narcolepsy
- Significant tests: Sleep study
- Specialist: Sleep medicine physician (Somnologist)

Sleep Medicine Physician / Somnologist
Occupation
- Names: Physician
- Activity sectors: Medicine, Psychiatry

Description
- Education required: Doctor of Medicine (MD); Doctor of Osteopathic Medicine (DO); Bachelor of Medicine, Bachelor of Surgery (MBBS/MBChB)

Sleep diary layout example

Sleep medicine or somnology (Note: In the medical field, sleep medicine and somnology are used synonymously for the same specialty, though the term somnology is also used in a broader sense for the scientific study of sleep.) is a medical specialty or subspecialty devoted to the diagnosis and therapy of sleep disturbances and disorders. From the middle of the 20th century, research in the field of somnology has provided increasing knowledge of, and answered many questions about, sleep–wake functioning. The rapidly evolving field has become a recognized medical subspecialty, with somnologists practicing in various countries. Dental sleep medicine also qualifies for board certification in some countries. Properly organized, minimum 12-month, postgraduate training programs are still being defined in the United States. The sleep physicians who treat patients (known as somnologists), may dually serve as sleep researchers in certain countries.

The first sleep clinics in the United States were established in the 1970s by interested physicians and technicians; the study, diagnosis and treatment of obstructive sleep apnea were their first tasks. As late as 1999, virtually any American physician, with no specific training in sleep medicine, could open a sleep laboratory.

Disorders and disturbances of sleep are widespread and can have significant consequences for affected individuals as well as economic and other consequences for society. The US National Transportation Safety Board has, according to Charles Czeisler, member of the Institute of Medicine and Director of the Harvard University Medical School Division of Sleep Medicine at Brigham and Women's Hospital, discovered that the leading cause (31%) of fatal-to-the-driver heavy truck crashes is fatigue related (though rarely associated directly with sleep disorders, such as sleep apnea), with drugs and alcohol as the number two cause (29%). Sleep deprivation has also been a significant factor in dramatic accidents, such as the Exxon Valdez oil spill, the nuclear incidents at Chernobyl and Three Mile Island and the explosion of the space shuttle Challenger.

== Scope and classification ==
Competence in sleep medicine requires an understanding of a plethora of very diverse disorders, many of which present with similar symptoms such as excessive daytime sleepiness, which, in the absence of volitional sleep deprivation, "is almost inevitably caused by an identifiable and treatable sleep disorder," such as sleep apnea, narcolepsy, idiopathic hypersomnia, Kleine-Levin syndrome, menstrual-related hypersomnia, idiopathic recurrent stupor, or circadian rhythm disturbances. Another common complaint is insomnia, a set of symptoms that can have many causes, physical and mental. Management in the varying situations differs greatly and cannot be undertaken without a correct diagnosis.

ICSD, The International Classification of Sleep Disorders, was restructured in 1990, in relation to its predecessor, to include only one code for each diagnostic entry and to classify disorders by pathophysiologic mechanism, as far as possible, rather than by primary complaint. Training in sleep medicine is multidisciplinary, and the present structure was chosen to encourage a multidisciplinary approach to diagnosis. Sleep disorders often do not fit neatly into traditional classification; differential diagnoses cross medical systems. Minor revisions and updates to the ICSD were made in 1997 and in following years. The present classification system in fact follows the groupings suggested by Nathaniel Kleitman, the "father of sleep research", in his seminal 1939 book Sleep and Wakefulness.

The revised ICSD, ICSD-R, placed the primary sleep disorders in the subgroups (1) dyssomnias, which include those that produce complaints of insomnia or excessive sleepiness, and (2) the parasomnias, which do not produce those primary complaints but intrude into or occur during sleep. A further subdivision of the dyssomnias preserves the integrity of circadian rhythm sleep disorders, as was mandated by about 200 doctors and researchers from all over the world who participated in the process between 1985 and 1990. The last two subgroups were (3) the medical or psychiatric sleep disorder section and (4) the proposed new disorders section. The authors found the heading "medical or psychiatric" less than ideal but better than the alternative "organic or non-organic", which seemed more likely to change in the future. Detailed reporting schemes aimed to provide data for further research. A second edition, called ICSD-2, was published in 2005, followed by a third edition (ICSD-3) in 2014 and a text revision (ICSD-3-TR) in 2023.

MeSH, Medical Subject Headings, a service of the US National Library of Medicine and the National Institutes of Health, uses similar broad categories: (1) dyssomnias, including narcolepsy, apnea, and the circadian rhythm sleep disorders, (2) parasomnias, which include, among others, bruxism (tooth-grinding), sleepwalking and bedwetting, and (3) sleep disorders caused by medical or psychiatric conditions. The system used produces "trees," approaching each diagnosis from up to several angles such that each disorder may be known by several codes.

DSM-IV-TR, the Diagnostic and Statistical Manual of Mental Disorders, Fourth Edition, Text Revision, using the same diagnostic codes as the International Statistical Classification of Diseases and Related Health Problems (ICD), divides sleep disorders into three groups: (1) primary sleep disorders, both the dyssomnias and the parasomnias, presumed to result from an endogenous disturbance in sleep–wake generating or timing mechanisms, (2) those secondary to mental disorders and (3) those related to a general medical condition or substance abuse.

Recent thinking opens for a common cause for mood and sleep disorders occurring in the same patient; a 2010 review states that, in humans, "single nucleotide polymorphisms in Clock and other clock genes have been associated with depression" and that the "evidence that mood disorders are associated with disrupted or at least inappropriately timed circadian rhythms suggests that treatment strategies or drugs aimed at restoring 'normal' circadian rhythmicity may be clinically useful."

== History ==
A 16th-century physician wrote that many laborers dozed off exhausted at the start of each night; sexual intercourse with their wives typically occurring in the watching period, after a recuperative first sleep. Anthropologists find that isolated societies without electric light sleep in a variety of patterns; seldom do they resemble our modern habit of sleeping in one single eight-hour bout. Much has been written about dream interpretation, from biblical times to Freud, but sleep itself was historically seen as a passive state of not-awake.

The concept of sleep medicine belongs to the second half of the 20th century. Due to the rapidly increasing knowledge about sleep, including the growth of the research field chronobiology from about 1960 and the discoveries of REM sleep (1952–53) and sleep apnea (first described in the medical literature in 1965), the medical importance of sleep was recognized. The medical community began paying more attention than previously to primary sleep disorders, such as sleep apnea, as well as the role and quality of sleep in other conditions. By the 1970s in the US, and in many western nations within the two following decades, clinics and laboratories devoted to the study of sleep and the treatment of its disorders had been founded. Most sleep doctors were primarily concerned with apnea; some were experts in narcolepsy. There was as yet nothing to restrict the use of the title "sleep doctor", and a need for standards arose.

Basic medical training has paid little attention to sleep problems; according to Benca in her review Diagnosis and Treatment of Chronic Insomnia (2005), most doctors are "not well trained with respect to sleep and sleep disorders," and a survey in 1990–91 of 37 American medical schools showed that sleep and sleep disorders were "covered" in less than two hours of total teaching time, on average. Benca's review cites a 2002 survey by Papp et al. of more than 500 primary care physicians who self-reported their knowledge of sleep disorders as follows: Excellent – 0%; Good – 10%, Fair – 60%; and Poor – 30%. The review of more than 50 studies indicates that both doctors and patients appear reluctant to discuss sleep complaints, in part because of perceptions that treatments for insomnia are ineffective or associated with risks, and:

Physicians may avoid exploring problems such as sleep difficulties in order to avoid having to deal with issues that could take up more than the normal allotted time for a patient.

Also, an editorial in the American College of Chest Physicians' (pulmonologists') journal CHEST in 1999 was quite concerned about the Conundrums in Sleep Medicine. The author, then chair of her organization's Sleep Section, asked "What is required to set up a sleep laboratory? Money and a building! Anyone can open a sleep laboratory, and it seems that just about everyone is." On the accreditation process for sleep laboratories, she continues: "This accreditation, however, is currently not required by most states, or more importantly, by most insurance carriers for reimbursements... There is also an American Board of Sleep Medicine (ABSM) that certifies individuals as sleep specialists. This certification presumably makes those individuals more qualified to run a sleep laboratory; however, the certification is not required to run a laboratory or to read sleep studies." Her concern at the turn of the century was:

Not all patients with hypersomnia have sleep apnea, and other diagnoses may be missed if the physician is only trained to diagnose and treat sleep apnea. Also, when a physician runs a sleep laboratory, they are "assumed" to be a sleep expert and are asked to evaluate and treat all types of sleep disorders when they are not adequately trained to do so.

In the UK, knowledge of sleep medicine and possibilities for diagnosis and treatment seem to lag. Guardian.co.uk quotes the director of the Imperial College Healthcare Sleep Centre: "One problem is that there has been relatively little training in sleep medicine in this country – certainly there is no structured training for sleep physicians." The Imperial College Healthcare site shows attention to obstructive sleep apnea syndrome (OSA) and very few other disorders, specifically not including insomnia.

== Training and certification ==
=== Worldwide ===
The World Federation of Sleep Research & Sleep Medicine Societies (WFSRSMS) was founded in 1987. As its name implies, members are concerned with basic and clinical research as well as medicine. Member societies in the Americas are the American Academy of Sleep Medicine (AASM), publisher of the Journal of Clinical Sleep Medicine; the Sleep Research Society (SRS), publisher of SLEEP; the Canadian Sleep Society (CSS) and the Federation of Latin American Sleep Societies (FLASS). WFSRSMS promotes both sleep research and physician training and education.

=== Africa ===
The Colleges of Medicine of South Africa (CMSA) provide the well-defined specialty Diploma in Sleep Medicine of the College of Neurologists of South Africa: DSM(SA), which was first promulgated by the Health Professions Council in 2007. The newly formed South African Society of Sleep Medicine (SASSM) was launched at its inaugural congress in February 2010. The society's membership is diverse; it includes general practitioners, ENT surgeons, pulmonologists, cardiologists, endocrinologists and psychiatrists.

=== Asia ===
WFSRSMS members in Asia include the Australasian Sleep Association (ASA) of New Zealand and Australia and the Asian Sleep Research Society (ASRS), an umbrella organization for the societies of several Asian nations.

=== Europe ===
The European Sleep Research Society (ESRS) is a member of the WFSRSMS. The Assembly of National Sleep Societies (ANSS), which includes both medical and scientific organizations from 26 countries as of 2007, is a formal body of the ESRS. The ESRS has published European Accreditation Guidelines for SMCs (Sleep Medicine Centres), the first of several proposed guidelines to coordinate and promote sleep science and medicine in Europe.

=== United States ===
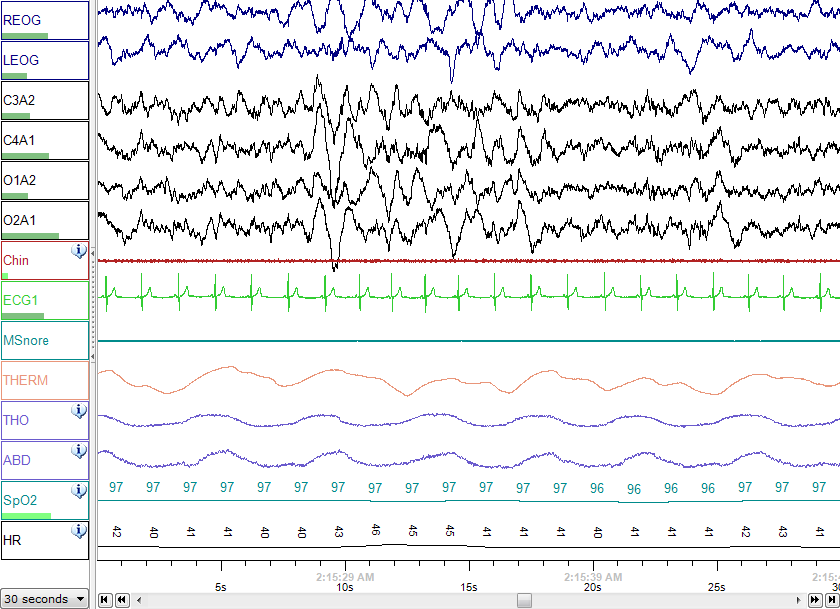
Polysomnography (PSG) is a multi-parametric test used as a diagnostic tool in sleep medicine.

The American Academy of Sleep Medicine (AASM), founded in 1978, administered the certification process and sleep medicine examination for doctors until 1990. Its independent daughter entity the American Board of Sleep Medicine (ABSM) was incorporated in 1991 and took over the aforementioned responsibilities. As of 2007, the ABSM ceased administering its examination, as it conceded that an examination process recognized by the American Board of Medical Specialties (ABMS) was advantageous to the field. Candidates who passed the ABSM exam in 1978–2006 retain lifetime certification as Diplomates of that organization.

The American Board of Psychiatry and Neurology (ABPN), and the corresponding boards of Internal Medicine, of Pediatrics, and of Otolaryngology (ear, nose and throat, ENT) now administer collectively the Sleep Medicine Certification exam for their members. Each board supervises the required 12 months of formal training for its candidates, while the exam is administered to all of them at the same time in the same place. For the first five years, 2007–2011, during "grandfathering", there was a "practice pathway" for ABSM certified specialists while additional, coordinated requirements were to be added after 2011. The ABPN provides information about the pathways, requirements and the exam on its website. Additionally, there are currently four boards of the American Osteopathic Association Bureau of Osteopathic Specialists that administer Sleep Medicine Certification exams. The American Osteopathic boards of Family Medicine, Internal Medicine, Neurology & Psychiatry, and Ophthalmology & Otolaryngology grant certificates of added qualification to qualified candidate physicians.

Sleep medicine is now a recognized subspecialty within anesthesiology, internal medicine, family medicine, pediatrics, otolaryngology, psychiatry and neurology in the US. Certification in Sleep Medicine by the several "Member Boards" of the ABMS shows that the specialist:

has demonstrated expertise in the diagnosis and management of clinical conditions that occur during sleep, that disturb sleep, or that are affected by disturbances in the wake–sleep cycle. This specialist is skilled in the analysis and interpretation of comprehensive polysomnography, and well-versed in emerging research and management of a sleep laboratory.

Pulmonologists, already subspecialists within internal medicine, may be accepted to sit for the board and be certified in Sleep Medicine after just a six-month fellowship, building on their knowledge of sleep-related breathing problems, rather than the usual twelve-month fellowship required of other specialists.

Sleep dentistry (bruxism, snoring and sleep apnea), while not recognized as one of the nine dental specialties, qualifies for board-certification by the American Board of Dental Sleep Medicine (ABDSM). The resulting Diplomate status is recognized by the AASM, and these dentists are organized in the Academy of Dental Sleep Medicine (USA). The qualified dentists collaborate with sleep doctors at accredited sleep centers and can provide several types of oral appliances or upper airway surgery to treat or manage sleep-related breathing disorders as well as tooth-grinding and clenching.

Laboratories for sleep-related breathing disorders are accredited by the AASM and are required to follow the Code of Medical Ethics of the American Medical Association. The new and very detailed Standards for Accreditation are available online. Sleep disorder centers, or clinics, are accredited by the same body, whether hospital-based, university-based or "freestanding"; they are required to provide testing and treatment for all sleep disorders and to have on staff a sleep specialist who has been certified by the American Board of Sleep Medicine and otherwise meet similar standards.

== Diagnostic methods ==
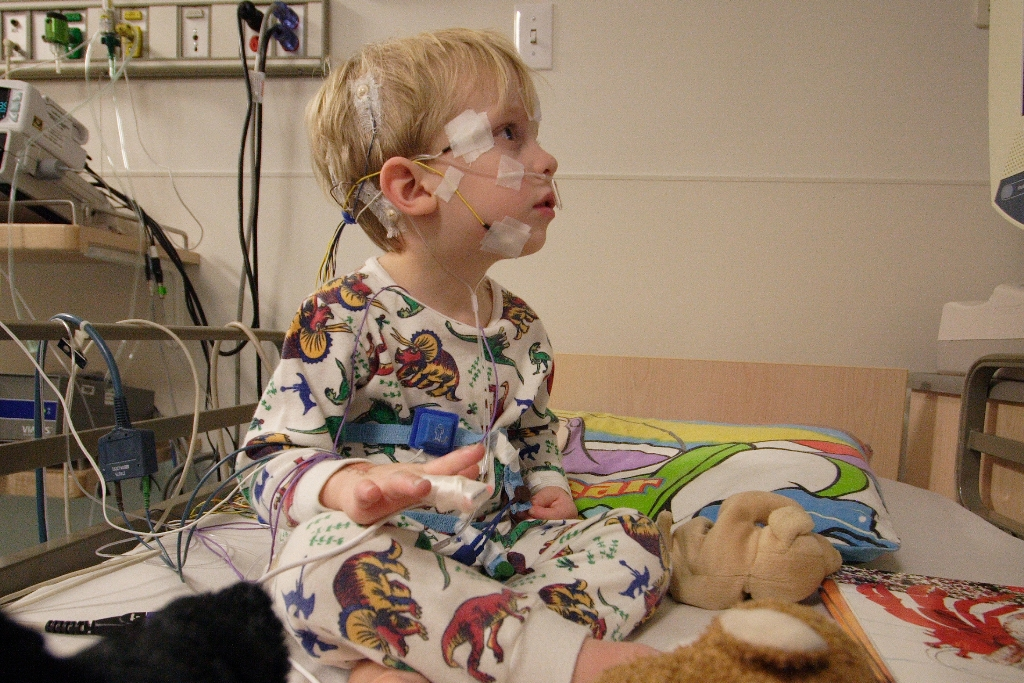
Pediatric polysomnography

The taking of a thorough medical history while keeping in mind alternative diagnoses and the possibility of more than one ailment in the same patient is the first step. Symptoms for very different sleep disorders may be similar and it must be determined whether any psychiatric problems are primary or secondary.

The patient history includes previous attempts at treatment and coping and a careful medication review. Differentiation of transient from chronic disorders and primary from secondary ones influences the direction of evaluation and treatment plans.

The Epworth Sleepiness Scale (ESS), designed to give an indication of sleepiness and correlated with sleep apnea, or other questionnaires designed to measure excessive daytime sleepiness, are diagnostic tools that can be used repeatedly to measure results of treatment.

A sleep diary, also called sleep log or sleep journal, kept by a patient at home for at least two weeks, while subjective, may help determine the extent and nature of sleep disturbance and the level of alertness in the normal environment. A parallel journal kept by a parent or bed partner, if any, can also be helpful. Sleep logs can also be used for self-monitoring and in connection with behavioral and other treatment. The image at the top of this page, with nighttime in the middle and the weekend in the middle, shows a layout that can aid in noticing trends

An actigraph unit is a motion-sensing device worn on the wrist, generally for one or two weeks. It gives a gross picture of sleep–wake cycles and is often used to verify the sleep diary. It is cost-efficient when full polysomnography is not required.

Polysomnography is performed in a sleep laboratory while the patient sleeps, preferably at his or her usual sleeping time. The polysomnogram (PSG) objectively records sleep stages and respiratory events. It shows multiple channels of electroencephalogram (EEG), electrooculogram (EOG), electrocardiogram (ECG), nasal and oral airflow, abdominal, chest and leg movements and blood oxygen levels. A single part of a polysomnogram is sometimes measured at home with portable equipment, for example oximetry, which records blood oxygen levels throughout the night. Polysomnography is not routinely used in the evaluation of patients with insomnia or circadian rhythm disorders, except as needed to rule out other disorders. It will usually be a definitive test for sleep apnea.

Home Sleep Tests (HST) or Home Sleep Apnea Tests (HSAT) are types of sleep studies that can be performed in a patient's home to identify obstructive sleep apnea. HSTs are performed at home in the patient's usual sleep environment and thus are more representative of their natural sleep than staying overnight at a lab, where patients often experience "first night syndrome" These devices are increasing in utilization due to their convenience and cost effectiveness and the fact that many insurance companies now require them instead of polysomnography.

There are two main types of devices, Type III which includes four or more channels and can confirm if a patient has sleep apnea based on what is recorded. Type IV devices have two to three channels and are used more for screening patients before an in-lab study. CMS guidelines. HST is not useful for other types of sleep disorders such as parasomnias or narcolepsy.

A Multiple Sleep Latency Test (MSLT) is often performed during the entire day after polysomnography while the electrodes and other equipment are still in place. The patient is given nap opportunities every second hour; the test measures the number of minutes it takes from the start of a daytime nap period to the first signs of sleep. It is a measure of daytime sleepiness; it also shows whether REM sleep is achieved in a short nap, a typical indication of narcolepsy.

Imaging studies may be performed if a patient is to be evaluated for neurodegenerative disease or to determine the obstruction in obstructive sleep apnea.

Sleep Questionnaires: There are some validated questionnaires in sleep medicine such as:

- Tayside children's sleep questionnaire: A ten-item questionnaire for sleep disorders in children aged between one and five years old.
- Children's Sleep Habits Questionnaire
- Cleveland Adolescent Sleepiness Questionnaire (CASQ): There are 16 items to measure extreme sleepiness during the day in adolescents aged 11–17 years old.
- Munich Chronotype Questionnaire (MCTQ): Assesses the timing of sleep.

== Treatments ==
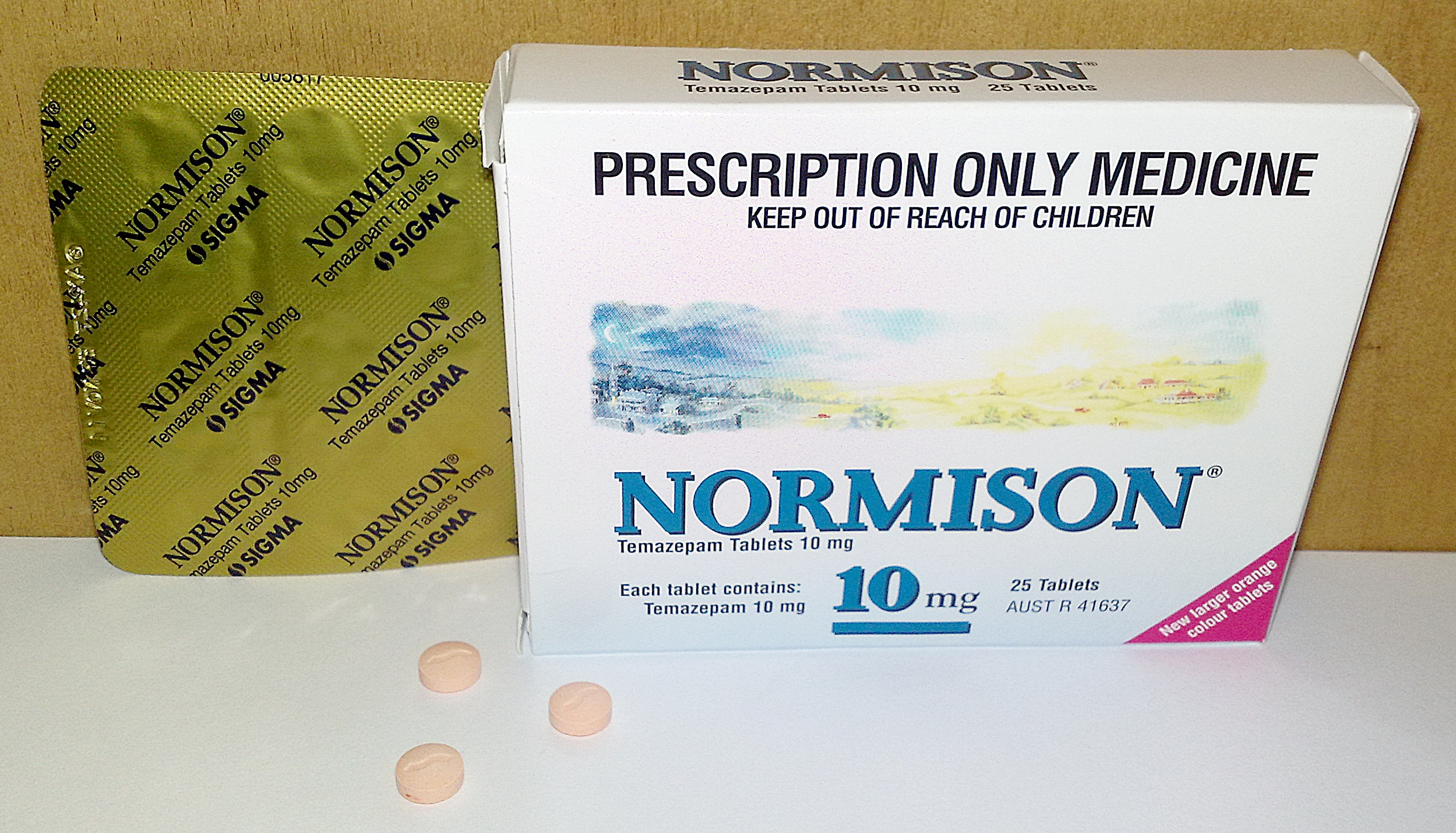
Normison (temazepam) is a benzodiazepine commonly prescribed for insomnia and other sleep disorders.

When sleep complaints are secondary to pain, other medical or psychiatric diagnoses, or substance abuse, it may be necessary to treat both the underlying cause and the sleep problems.

When the underlying cause of sleep problems is not immediately obvious, behavioral treatments are usually the first suggested. These range from patient education about sleep hygiene to cognitive behavioral therapy (CBT). Studies of both younger and older adults have compared CBT to medication and found that CBT should be considered a first-line and cost-effective intervention for chronic insomnia, not least because gains may be maintained at long-term follow-up. Somnologists (sleep physicians) and sleep psychologists, at least in the United States, are not in agreement about who should perform CBT nor whether sleep centers should be required to have psychologists on staff. In the United Kingdom, the number of CBT-trained therapists is limited so CBT is not widely available on the NHS.

Behavioral therapies include progressive relaxation, stimulus control (to reassociate the bed with sleepiness), limiting time-in-bed to increase sleep efficiency and debunking misconceptions about sleep.

Pharmacotherapy is necessary for some conditions. Medication may be useful for acute insomnia and for some of the parasomnias. It is almost always needed, along with scheduled short naps and close follow-up, in the treatment of narcolepsy and idiopathic hypersomnia.

Chronic circadian rhythm disorders, the most common of which is delayed sleep phase disorder, may be managed by specifically timed bright light therapy, usually in the morning, darkness therapy in the hours before bedtime, and timed oral administration of the hormone melatonin. Chronotherapy has also been prescribed for circadian rhythm disorders, though results are generally short-lived. Stimulants may also be prescribed. When these therapies are unsuccessful, counseling may be indicated to help a person adapt to and live with the condition. People with these disorders who have chosen a lifestyle in conformity with their sleeping schedules have no need of treatment, though they may need the diagnosis in order to avoid having to meet for appointments or meetings during their sleep time.

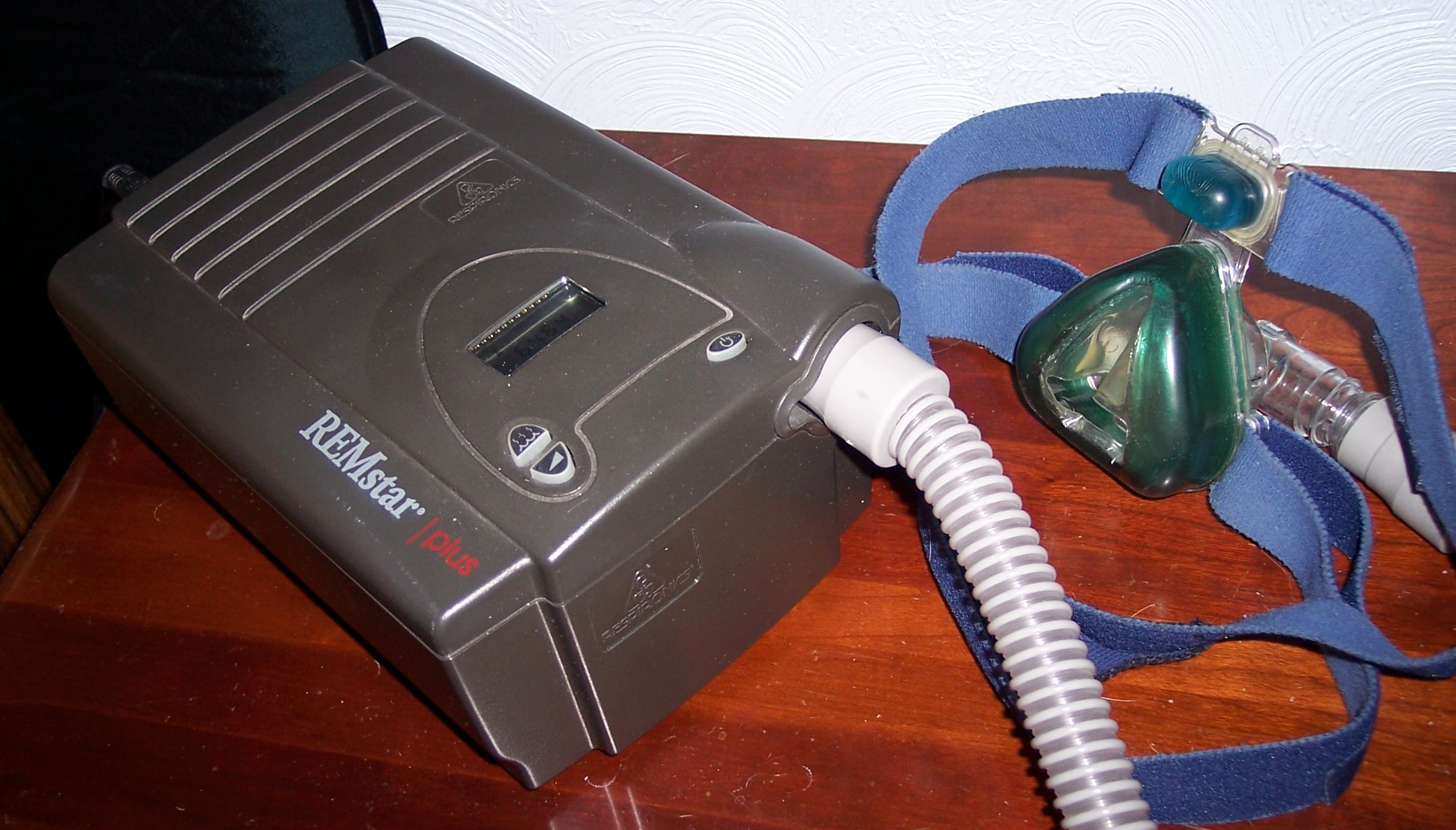
CPAP (positive airway pressure) machine

Continuous positive airway pressure (CPAP), Bilevel Continuous Positive Airway Pressure (BiPAP), or similar machines can be used nightly at home to effectively manage sleep-related breathing disorders such as apnea. In milder cases, oral appliances may be effective alternate treatments. For mild cases in obese people, weight reduction may be sufficient, but it is usually recommended as an adjunct to CPAP treatment since sustaining weight loss is difficult. In some cases, upper airway surgery, generally performed by an otolaryngologist/head & neck surgeon or occasionally an oral and maxillofacial surgeon, is indicated. The treatments prevent airway collapse, which interrupts breathing during sleep. A 2001 study published by Hans-Werner Gessmann in the Journal of Sleep Medicine and Sleep Psychology found that patients who practiced a series of electrical stimulations of suprahyoidal tongue muscles for 20 minutes a day showed a marked decline in sleep apnea symptoms after two months. Patients experienced an average of 36% fewer apnea episodes after successfully completing the treatments.

According to the National Cancer Institute (NCI), about 50% of cancer patients have trouble sleeping. Difficulty sleeping can include Restless Leg Syndrome (RLS), sleeping that is fragmented, or insomnia. Some reports show that up to 80% of patients who are undergoing cancer treatments experience some form of insomnia. One of the significant reasons for sleeping problems is stress, uncertainty, and fear. Other patients have difficulty sleeping directly due to their treatments while others experience pain that affects sleep quality. Other factors include diet and less than optimum sleeping conditions. Cancer has also been shown to be a cause of increased sleep apnea, which adds to the potential issues.

== See also ==
- American Academy of Sleep Medicine
- Environmental noise health effects
- Polysomnographic technician
- Reversed vegetative symptoms
- Sleep study
- Sundowning (dementia)
- White noise machine
