= Bed rotting =

Practice of spending large amounts of time in bed

An illustration of a person bed rotting while on social media

Bed rotting is the practice of voluntarily spending many hours a day in bed while awake. The term gained popularity among Generation Z users on TikTok. It has been discussed as a form of self-care, but has also been associated with depression and anxiety.

== Description ==
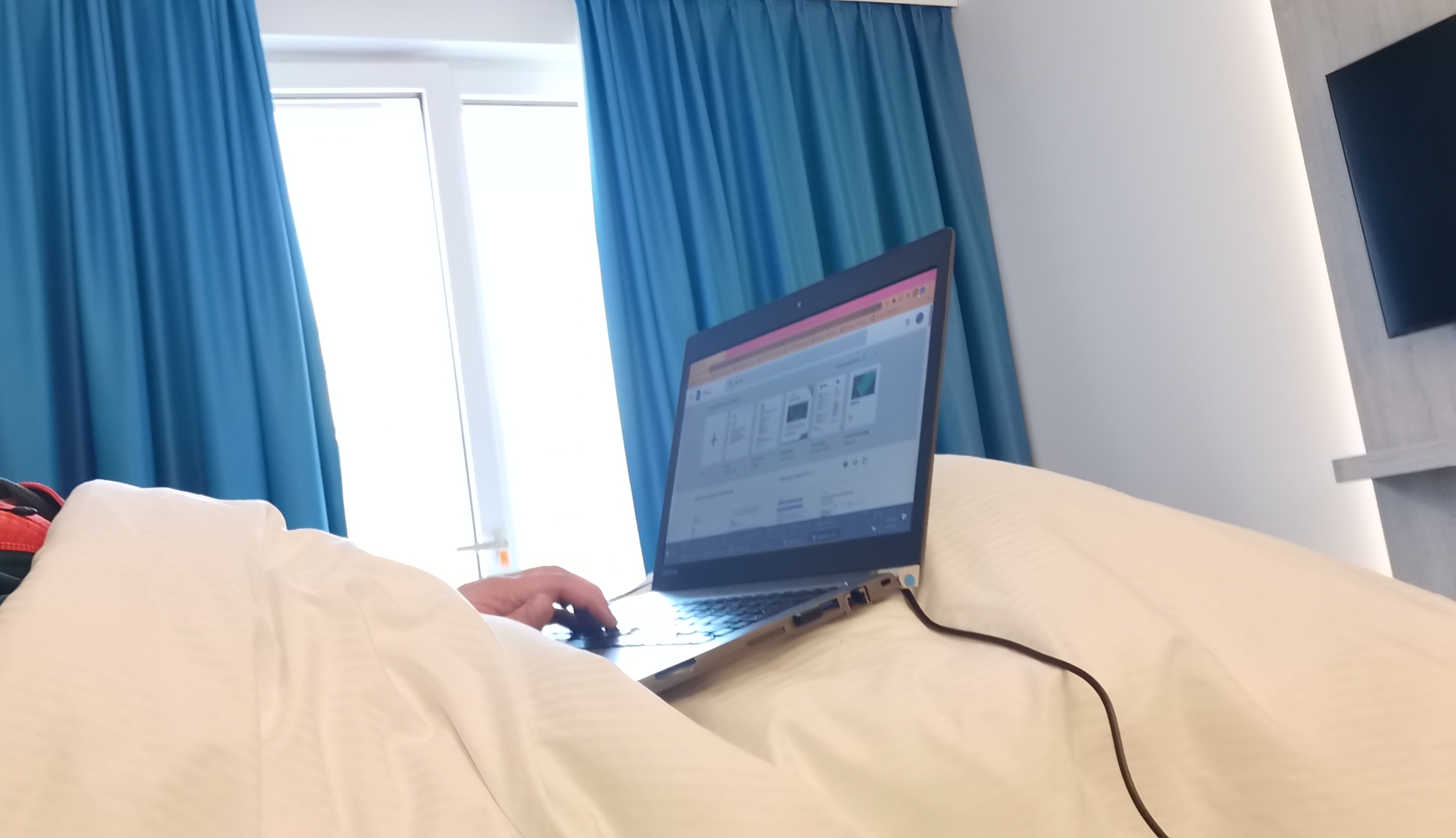
A person using a laptop in bed

Bed rotting can involve spending time on devices, such as a phone, laptop, video game console, or television, or reading a book while in bed. It is used to rest, recover from mental fatigue, or respond to burnout. It may become problematic when it contributes to avoiding outdoor activity, social interaction, or responsibilities. In some cases, bed rotting has been linked to poor hygiene, depression, and anxiety.

The trend has gained attention on social media, where users share their bed-rotting experiences. Platforms such as TikTok have popularised the behaviour; a 2024 survey found that nearly a quarter of Generation Z respondents reported staying in bed for a day or more to relax or use devices. The term was added to Dictionary.com in 2024, along with more than 1,700 new or updated definitions, after the practice became more visible on social media. The term refers to spending many daytime hours in bed, often with snacks or an electronic device, as a voluntary withdrawal from activity or stress.

== Analysis ==
Bed rotting can be a response to stress or anxiety. Lifehacker described the practice as "an aspect of JOMO". Bed rotting may provide short-term rest for some people, but can become concerning if it continues for more than one or two days.

It has been linked to similar online behaviours such as doomscrolling, in which a person spends extended periods consuming short-form content or news.

== See also ==
- Bed rest – Medical treatment involving resting in bed
- Clinophilia – Sleep disorder
- Couch potato – Person who spends most of their free time sitting or lying on a couch
- Doomscrolling – Compulsive consumption of negative online contents
- Tang ping
- Hikikomori
