= Sleep study =

Medical recording of sleep activity

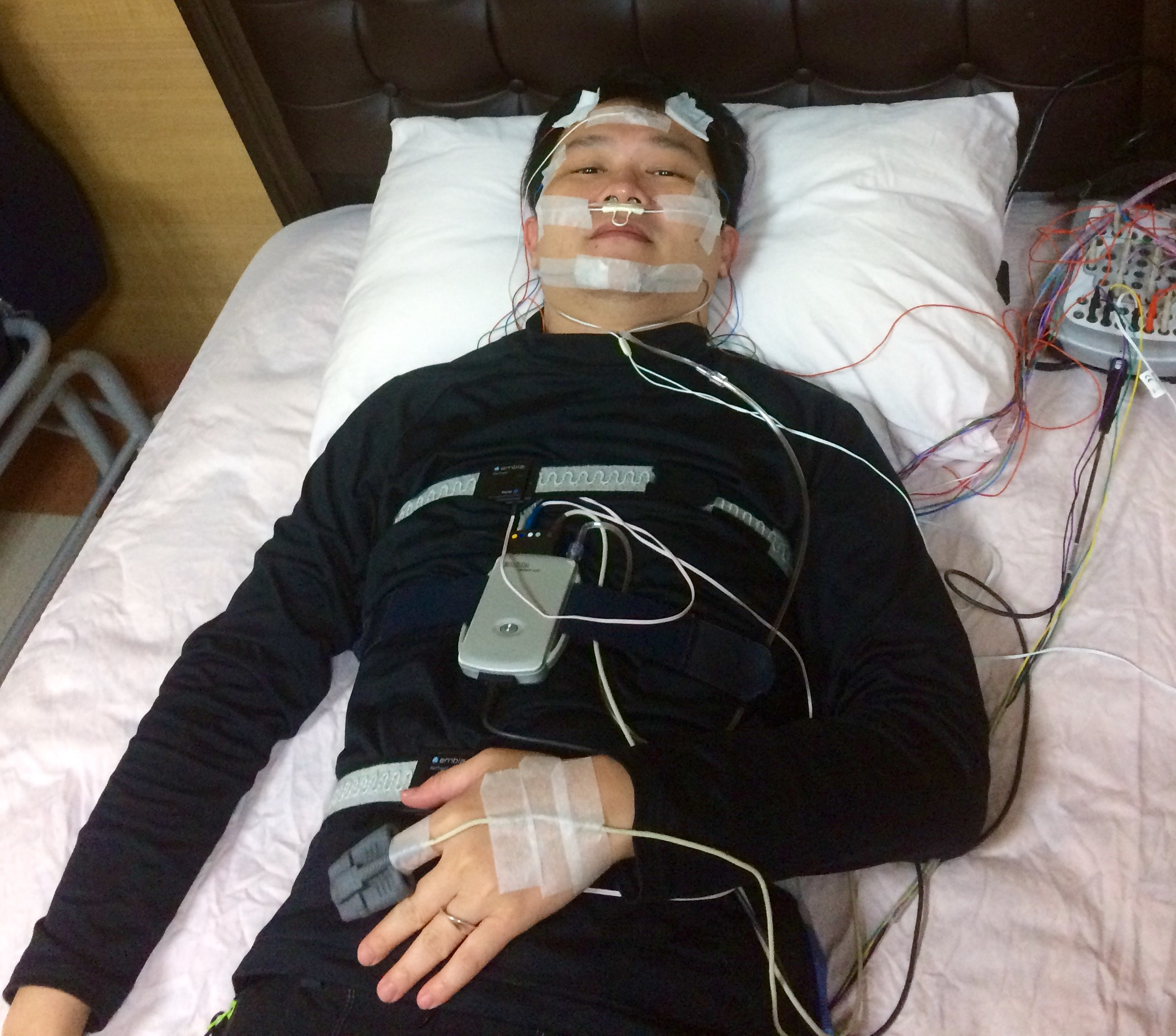
Polysomnography, a multi-parameter sleep study

A sleep study is a test that records the activity of the body during sleep. There are five main types of sleep studies that use different methods to test for different sleep characteristics and disorders. These include simple sleep studies, polysomnography, multiple sleep latency tests, maintenance of wakefulness tests, and home sleep tests.

In medicine, sleep studies have been useful in identifying and ruling out various sleep disorders. Sleep studies have also been valuable to psychology, in which they have provided insight into brain activity and the other physiological factors of both sleep disorders and normal sleep. This has allowed further research to be done on the relationship between sleep and behavioral and psychological factors.

== Utility ==
Depending on the method being used, sleep studies can help diagnose or rule out the following disorders:

- Sleep-related breathing disorders, such as sleep apnea (repetitive pauses in breathing, shallow breathing, or collapse of the upper airway during sleep result in poor ventilation and sleep disruption).
- Problems sleeping at night (insomnia): caused by stress, depression, hunger, physical discomfort, or other problems.
- Sleep-related movement disorders, such as periodic limb movement disorder, which is repeated involuntary muscle twitching of the feet, legs, or arms during sleep. Sleep studies may be used to diagnose or rule out restless legs syndrome. However, this syndrome usually is diagnosed based on signs and symptoms, medical history, and a physical exam.
- Sleep bruxism; excessive grinding of the teeth or jaw clenching during sleep.
- Problems with nighttime behaviors, such as sleepwalking, night terrors, or bed-wetting
- Sleep disorders that cause extreme daytime tiredness, such as narcolepsy or circadian rhythm sleep disorders.
- Shift work sleep disorder; problems sleeping during the day because of working at night or rotating shift work. This is a circadian rhythm sleep disorder.
- Sleep-related seizure disorders
- Problems with stages of sleep. The two primary categories of sleep are non-rapid eye movement sleep (NREM) and rapid eye movement sleep (REM). Normally, four to five series of non-rapid eye movement sleep and rapid eye movement sleep make up a night's sleep. A change in this cycle may make it hard to sleep soundly.

== Types ==
The most common sleep studies are:

=== Polysomnogram ===
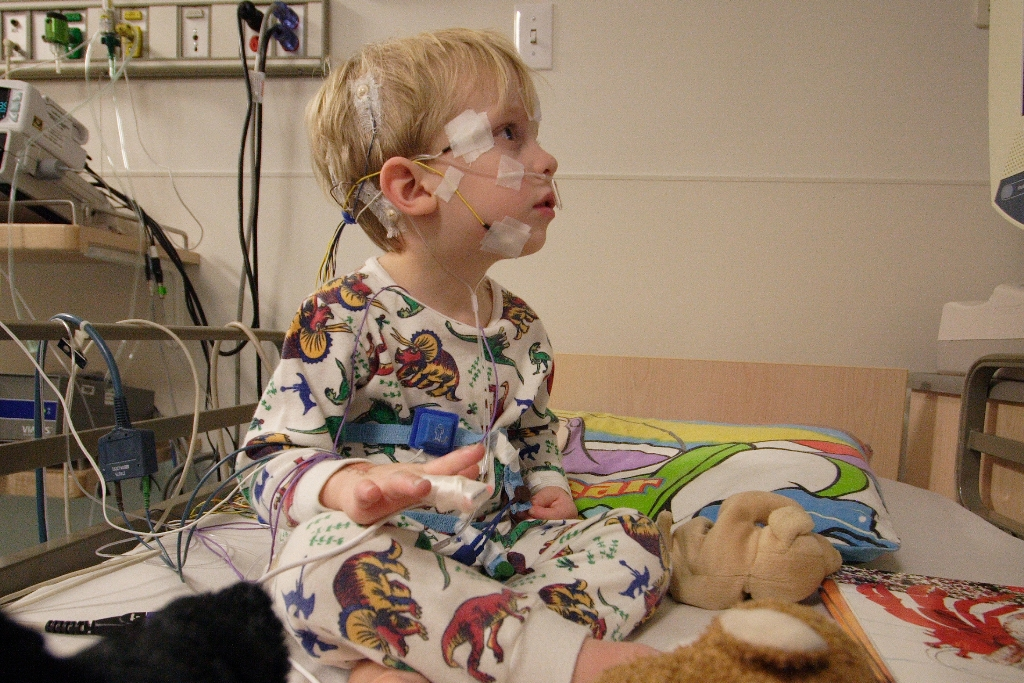
Pediatric polysomnography

Polysomnography records several body functions during sleep, including brain activity, eye movement, oxygen and carbon dioxide blood levels, heart rate and heart rhythm, breathing rate and rhythm, the flow of air through the mouth and nose, snoring, body muscle movements, and chest and belly movement. These tests are typically done at night in a hospital or sleep center. Polysomnogram tests can give insight into what issue is occurring.

=== Multiple sleep latency test ===
The multiple sleep latency test measures, by several (four) nap opportunities in one day, how long it takes a person to fall asleep. It also determines whether rapid eye movement appears upon falling asleep. It is usually performed immediately after an overnight study. This test is the standard to test for narcolepsy and idiopathic hypersomnia.

=== Maintenance of wakefulness test ===
This test measures whether a person can stay awake during a time when she or he is normally awake. Like the multiple sleep latency tests, the maintenance of wakefulness test is performed in a sleep diagnostic center over 4–5 nap periods. A mean sleep onset latency of less than 10 minutes is suggestive of excessive daytime sleepiness.

=== Home sleep test ===
These typically include the individual whose sleep is being studied receiving a portable monitor and may include other items such as a finger clip and an airflow sensor. Items measured include oxygen saturation, heart rate, airflow, body movement, time spent snoring, sleep position, and brain waves.

A home sleep apnea test allows calculation of apnea-hypopnea index and respiratory disturbance index and differentiation between primary snoring and obstructive sleep apnea.

=== Sleep questionnaires ===
- Tayside children's sleep questionnaire: A ten-item questionnaire for sleep disorders in children aged between one and five years old.
- Children's Sleep Habits Questionnaire.
- Cleveland Adolescent Sleepiness Questionnaire: There are 16 items to measure extreme sleepiness during the day in adolescents aged 11–17 years old.

== Sleep study in psychology ==
Sleep studies have been imperative for the empirical research of sleep psychology. The area of sleep psychology evaluates the physiological, and behavioral factors of normal sleep and sleep disorders along with the neuroscience and brain-wave activity associated with sleep, as well as the study of circadian rhythms.

== Administers of sleep studies ==
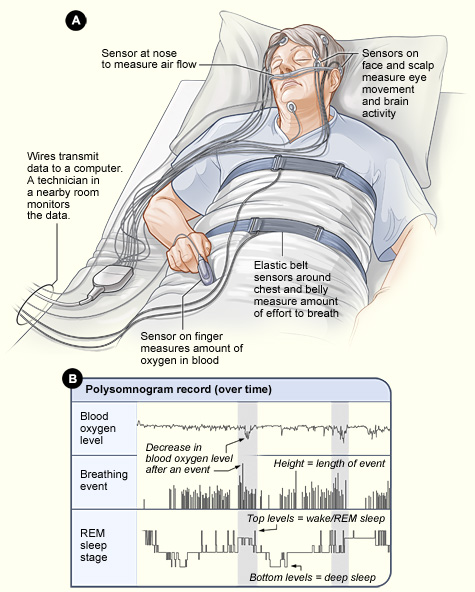
Standard setup for a polysomnogram

Sleep Specialists are doctors who are board certified in sleep medicine. Doctors qualified to order a sleep study include:

- Primary care physician: A doctor who provides first contact for a person with a health concern.
- Sleep specialists: Board-certified sleep medicine doctors have undergone special training and testing to ensure they can diagnose all sleep-related disorders, including sleep apnea.
- Neurologist: A neurologist treats disorders that affect the brain, spinal cord, and nerves.
- Psychiatrists: A medical practitioner specializing in the diagnosis and treatment of mental illness.
- Pulmonologists: A medical practitioner specializing in the diagnosis and treatment of lung and breathing disorders.
