= American Association of Sleep Technologists =

The American Association of Sleep Technologists (AAST) is an organization that promotes the interests of sleep technologists. It promotes standardized education for sleep technicians, sleep technologists and sleep center managers. It spends resources defending the profession of sleep technology from legislative threats. It is a major provider of continuing education credits (CECs) for RPSGTs and CPSGTs.

The AAST also holds an annual meeting, several days long, which provides sleep technologists to meet and also earn a number of CECs. A2Zzz is the quarterly publication of the AAST. It provides news and articles about subjects related to polysomnography. A2Zzz also provides the opportunity for RPSGTs and CPSGTs to earn 1.5 CECs per issue.

The AAST was founded in April 1978 when thirty to forty sleep technologists gathered. The organization was originally called the Association of Polysomnographic Technologists (APT). The APT for many years grew slowly. In 2000 it had almost 1,200 members. At the end of 2003 the APT had just under 2,000 members. In 2004 the APT contracted with the American Academy of Sleep Medicine (AASM) for various management services. This relationship enabled the organization to expand and improve resources and services for its members.

In 2006 the APT membership voted to change the organization's name to its present name. By the end of that year the AAST had 3,800 members. It has continued to grow every year. By the end of 2010 the AAST had almost 5,200 members.

== Additional References ==
- Tor Valenza, "Keeping Pace with the Progress of Sleep Medicine," Sept. 28, 2012, in Sleep Review online, at https://web.archive.org/web/20130731000049/http://www.sleepreviewmag.com/continuing-education/15233-keeping-pace-with-the-progress-of-sleep-medicine .
- "AAST Weighs In on ABSM Sleep Tech Credential," Feb. 16, 2011, in Sleep Review online, at .
- "AAST Equips State Sleep Society Leaders at National Conference," Oct. 12, 2011, in Sleep Review online, at .
- Kristen Ziegler, "A New Path to Polysomnography: Reaction mixed to ABSM sleep tech credential," May 16, 2011, in Advance for Respiratory Care & Sleep Medicine, at http://respiratory-care-sleep-medicine.advanceweb.com/Archives/Article-Archives/A-New-Path-to-Polysomnography.aspx .
- John H. Ganoe, CAE, "A Snapshot of RPSGT Recertification: New process for RPSGTs starts in January," Aug. 16, 2010, in Advance for Respiratory Care & Sleep Medicine, http://respiratory-care-sleep-medicine.advanceweb.com/Columns/From-Our-Alliance-BRPT/A-Snapshot-of-Recertification.aspx .
- FAQs about various sleep organizations and what they do in the Sleep Professionals Association website, at http://www.sleeppro.org/FAQ.html .
- "Primed for New Challenges: Polysomnography Comes of Age," June 3, 2009, in RT online, at .
