= Children's Sleep Habits Questionnaire =

Proper Sleeping Habits

- Purpose: measure sleep behavior in children

The Children's Sleep Habits Questionnaire (CSHQ) is a psychological questionnaire designed to measure sleep behaviors in children and adolescents ages 4–12. The 52-question test is filled out by the parent and the parent is asked to rate the frequency that their child has shown the qualities of the described sleep behaviors. This question test takes approximately 10 minutes to complete. The CSHQ has demonstrated good reliability and validity in measuring child sleep habits and problems.

The CSHQ can help find sleep difficulties like Sleep Anxiety, Bedtime Resistance, and Night Wakings, which can then help a child's daytime behavior. The child's daytime behaviors can include emotional health, academic performance, or even their relationships. Because of this, many children have then had higher levels of anger or sadness and cannot concentrate on the task at hand. These can all be affected by poor sleep habits.
