= Stanford Sleepiness Scale =

- Purpose: measures level of sleepiness at night

The Stanford Sleepiness Scale (SSS), developed by William C. Dement and colleagues in 1972, is a one-item self-report questionnaire measuring levels of sleepiness throughout the day. The scale has been validated for adult populations and is generally used to track overall alertness at each hour of the day. The SSS is used in both research and clinical settings to assess the level of intervention or effectiveness of a specific treatment in order to compare a client's progress.

== Reliability and validity ==
=== Reliability ===
Reliability refers to whether the scores are reproducible. Unless otherwise specified, the reliability scores and values come from studies done with a United States population sample.

Rubric for evaluating norms and reliability for the General Behavior Inventory (table from Youngstrom et al., extending Hunsley & Mash, 2008; *indicates new construct or category)
| Criterion | Rating (adequate, good, excellent, too good*) | Explanation with references |
|---|---|---|
| Norms | Not applicable | Mean and standard deviation do not exist because the SSS is a single item questionnaire. |
| Internal consistency (Cronbach's alpha, split half, etc.) | Not applicable | SSS only has one question |
| Inter-rater reliability | Not applicable | Designed originally as a self-report scale |
| Test-retest reliability (stability) | Good | r = .88 |
| Repeatability | Not published | No published studies formally checking repeatability |

=== Validity ===
Validity describes the evidence that an assessment tool measures what it was supposed to measure. Unless otherwise specified, the reliability scores and values come from studies done with a United States population sample.

| Criterion | Rating (adequate, good, excellent, too good*) | Explanation with references |
|---|---|---|
| Content validity | Adequate | Follows characteristics of alertness, but sleepiness is not unidimensional and difficult to quantify |
| Construct validity (e.g., predictive, concurrent, convergent, and discriminant validity) | Good | Shows convergent validity with other symptom scales such as ESS and Karolinska Sleepiness Scale, prediction of performance after sleep deprivation |
| Discriminative validity | Adequate | Studies do not report AUCs, some mention overlap between sleepiness, physical tiredness, and depression |
| Validity generalization | Good | Evidence supports use in a variety of research and clinical settings, but only in persons of 18 years and older |
| Treatment sensitivity | Not applicable | SSS is not intended for use as a measure of outcome |
| Clinical utility | Adequate | Free (public domain), brief, easy administration |

== Development and history ==
The SSS was developed to measure subjective sleepiness in research and clinical settings. Other instruments measuring sleepiness tend to examine the general experience of sleepiness over the course of a day, but the SSS met a need for a scale measuring sleepiness in specific moments of time. Because it can be used to evaluate specific moments, the scale can be used repeatedly at different time intervals in a research study or for treatment intervention.

== Use in other populations ==
Since the development of the SSS, there have been other more specific and more recently developed sleepiness rating scales, such as the Epworth Sleepiness Scale, which is more commonly used in other populations. Due to the fact that it has only been translated into English and French, it is not significantly used in other populations.

== Limitations ==
The primary limitations of the Stanford Sleepiness Scale is that it is a self-report measure, because of this, levels of sleepiness may be over or under reported based on personal biases.

== See also ==
- Sleepiness
- Sleep disorder
