= Polysomnography =

Multi-parameter study of sleep and sleep disorders

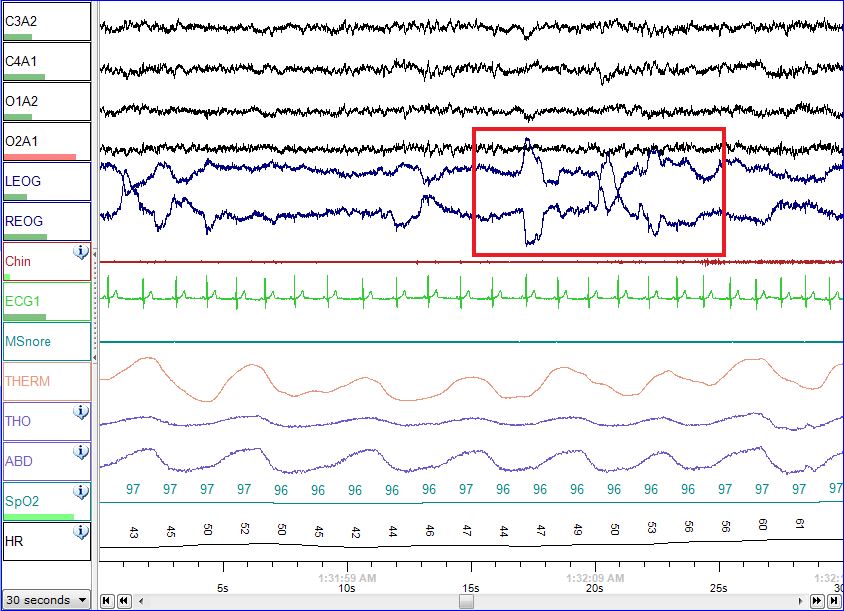
- Polysomnographic record of REM sleep. Eye movements highlighted by red rectangle.
- ICD-9-CM: 89.17
- MeSH: D017286
- OPS-301 code: 1-790
- MedlinePlus: 003932
- LOINC: 28633-6

Polysomnography (PSG) is a multi-parameter type of sleep study and a diagnostic tool in sleep medicine. The test result is called a polysomnogram, also abbreviated PSG. The name is derived from Greek and Latin roots: the Greek πολύς (polus for "many, much", indicating many channels), the Latin somnus ("sleep"), and the Greek γράφειν (graphein, "to write").

Type I polysomnography is a sleep study performed overnight with the patient continuously monitored by a credentialed technologist. It records the physiological changes that occur during sleep, usually at night, though some labs can accommodate shift workers and people with circadian rhythm sleep disorders who sleep at other times. The PSG monitors many body functions, including brain activity (EEG), eye movements (EOG), muscle activity or skeletal muscle activation (EMG), and heart rhythm (ECG). After the identification of the sleep disorder sleep apnea in the 1970s, breathing functions, respiratory airflow, and respiratory effort indicators were added along with peripheral pulse oximetry. Polysomnography no longer includes NPT monitoring for erectile dysfunction, as it is reported that all male patients will experience erections during phasic REM sleep, regardless of dream content.

Limited channel polysomnography, or unattended home sleep tests, are called Type II–IV channel polysomnography. Polysomnography should only be performed by technicians and technologists who are specifically accredited in sleep medicine. However, at times nurses and respiratory therapists perform polysomnography without specific knowledge and training in the field.

Polysomnography data can be directly related to sleep onset latency (SOL), REM-sleep onset latency, number of awakenings during the sleep period, total sleep duration, percentages and durations of every sleep stage, and number of arousals. It may also record other information crucial for diagnostics that are not directly linked with sleep, such as movements, respiration, and cardiovascular parameters. In any case, through polysomnographic evaluation, other information (such as body temperature or esophageal pH) can be obtained according to the patient's or the study's needs.

Video-EEG polysomnography, which combines polysomnography with video recording, has been described as more effective than polysomnography alone for the evaluation of sleep troubles such as parasomnias, because it allows easier correlation of EEG and polysomnography with bodily motion.

== Medical uses ==
Polysomnography is used to diagnose or rule out many types of sleep disorders, including narcolepsy, idiopathic hypersomnia, periodic limb movement disorder (PLMD), REM behavior disorder, parasomnias, and sleep apnea. Although it is not directly useful in diagnosing circadian rhythm sleep disorders, it may be used to rule out other sleep disorders.

The use of polysomnography as a screening test for persons with excessive daytime sleepiness as their sole presenting complaint is controversial.

== Mechanism ==
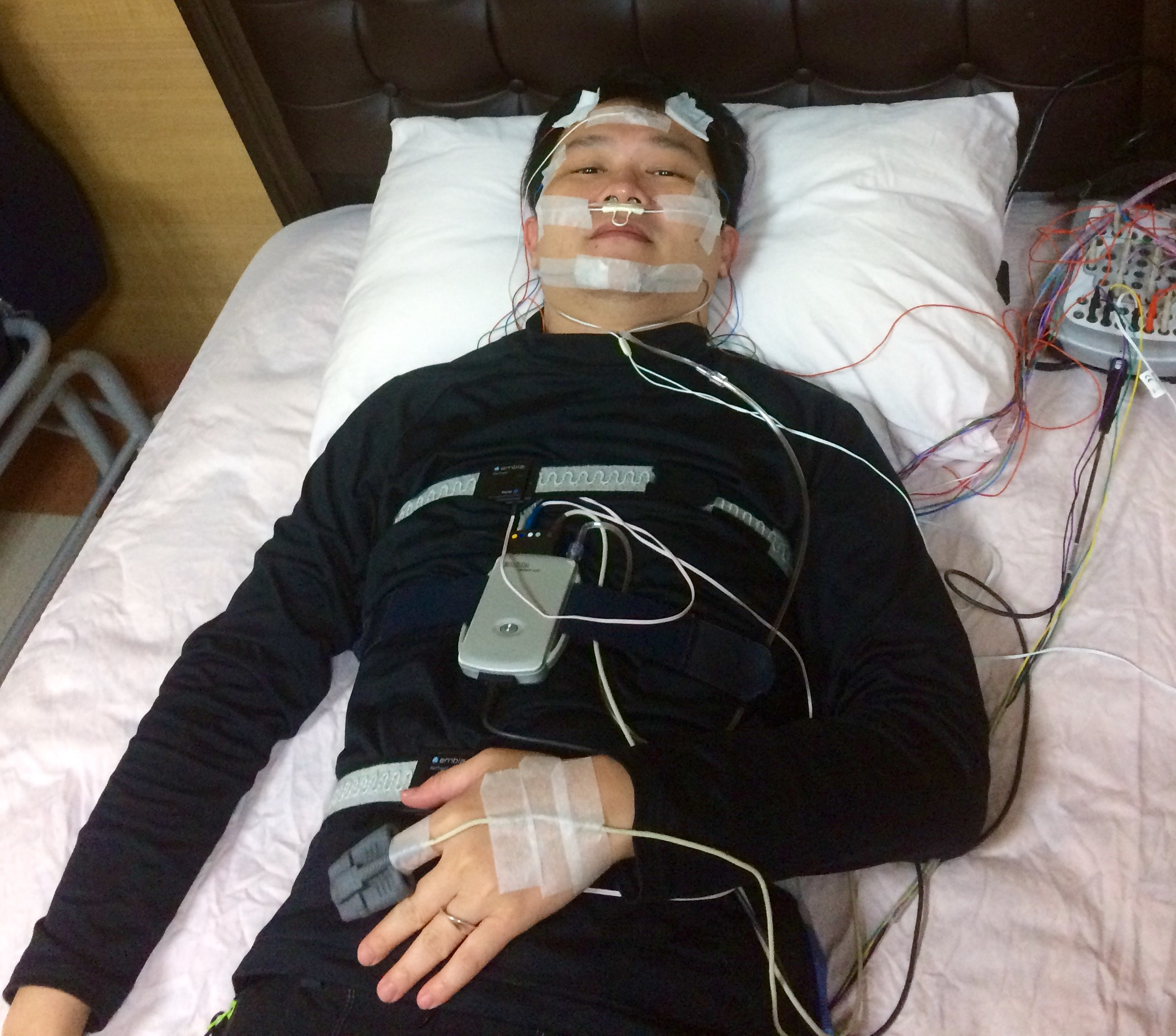
Use of equipment for overnight diagnosis in hospitalization records

A polysomnogram will typically record a minimum of 12 channels, requiring a minimum of 22 wire attachments to the patient. These channels vary in every lab and may be adapted to meet the doctor's requests. A minimum of three channels are used for the EEG, one or two measure airflow, one or two are for chin muscle tone, one or more for leg movements, two for eye movements (EOG), one or two for heart rate and rhythm, one for oxygen saturation, and one each for the belts, which measure chest wall movement and upper abdominal wall movement. The movement of the belts is typically measured with piezoelectric sensors or respiratory inductance plethysmography. This movement is equated to effort and produces a low-frequency sinusoidal waveform as the patient inhales and exhales.

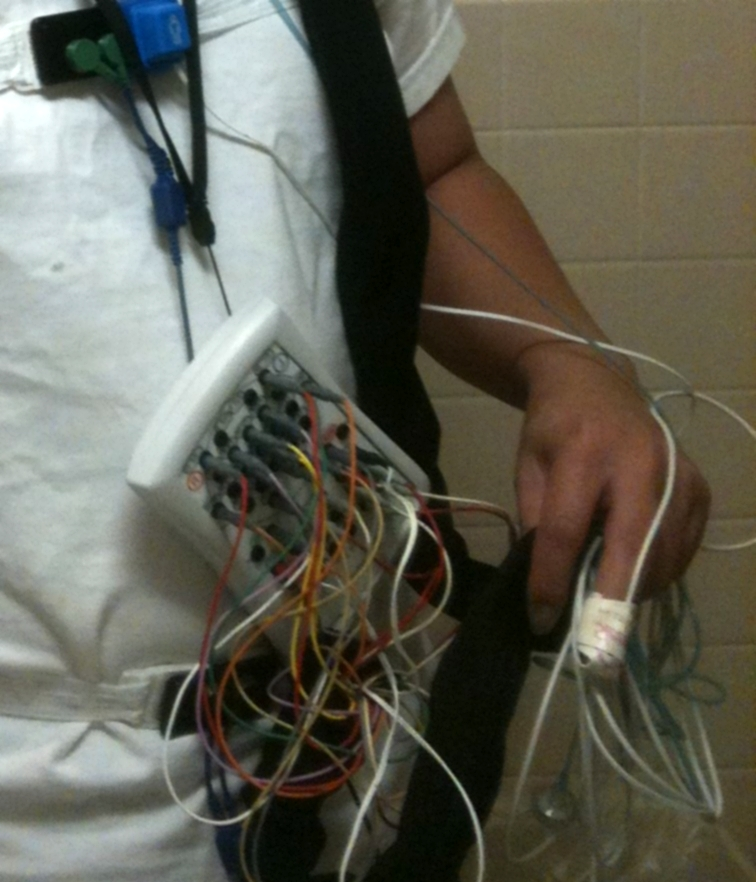
Polysomnography wire connections on an adult patient

Wires for each channel of recorded data lead from the patient and converge into a central box, which in turn is connected to a computer system for recording, storing and displaying the data. During sleep, the computer monitor can display multiple channels continuously. In addition, most labs have a small video camera in the room so the technician can observe the patient visually from an adjacent room.

The electroencephalogram (EEG) will generally use six "exploring" electrodes and two "reference" electrodes, unless a seizure disorder is suspected, in which case more electrodes will be applied to document the appearance of seizure activity. The exploring electrodes are usually attached to the scalp near the frontal, central (top) and occipital (back) portions of the brain via a paste that will conduct electrical signals originating from the neurons of the cortex. These electrodes will provide a readout of the brain activity that can be "scored" into different stages of sleep (N1, N2, and N3 – which combined are referred to as NREM sleep – and Stage R, which is rapid eye movement sleep, or REM, and wakefulness). The EEG electrodes are placed according to the International 10-20 system.

The electrooculogram (EOG) uses two electrodes, one that is placed 1 cm above the outer canthus of the right eye and one that is placed 1 cm below the outer canthus of the left eye. These electrodes pick up the activity of the eyes in virtue of the electropotential difference between the cornea and the retina (the cornea is positively charged relative to the retina). This helps to determine when REM sleep occurs, of which rapid eye movements are characteristic, and also essentially aids in determining when sleep occurs.

The electromyogram (EMG) typically uses four electrodes to measure muscle tension in the body as well as to monitor for an excessive amount of leg movements during sleep (which may be indicative of periodic limb movement disorder, PLMD). Two leads are placed on the chin with one above the jawline and one below. This, like the EOG, helps determine when sleep occurs as well as REM sleep. Sleep generally includes relaxation and so a marked decrease in muscle tension occurs. A further decrease in skeletal muscle tension occurs in REM sleep. A person becomes partially paralyzed to make acting out of dreams impossible, although people that do not have this paralysis can develop REM behavior disorder. Finally, two more leads are placed on the anterior tibialis of each leg to measure leg movements.

Though a typical electrocardiogram (ECG or EKG) would use ten electrodes, only two or three are used for a polysomnogram. They can either be placed under the collarbone on each side of the chest or one under the collarbone and the other six inches above the waist on either side of the body. These electrodes measure the electrical activity of the heart as it contracts and expands, recording such features as the "P" wave, "QRS" complex, and "T" wave. These can be analyzed for any abnormalities that might be indicative of an underlying heart pathology.

Nasal and oral airflow can be measured using pressure transducers, and/or a thermocouple, fitted in or near the nostrils; the pressure transducer is considered the more sensitive. This allows the clinician/researcher to measure the rate of respiration and identify interruptions in breathing. Respiratory effort is also measured in concert with nasal/oral airflow by the use of belts. These belts expand and contract upon breathing effort. However, this method of respiration may also produce false negatives. Some patients will open and close their mouth while obstructive apneas occur. This forces air in and out of the mouth while no air enters the airway and lungs. Thus, the pressure transducer and thermocouple will detect this diminished airflow and the respiratory event may be falsely identified as a hypopnea, or a period of reduced airflow, instead of an obstructive apnea.

Pulse oximetry determines changes in blood oxygen levels that often occur with sleep apnea and other respiratory problems. The pulse oximeter fits over a fingertip or an earlobe.

Snoring may be recorded with a sound probe over the neck, though more commonly the sleep technician will just note snoring as "mild", "moderate" or "loud" or give a numerical estimate on a scale of 1 to 10. Also, snoring indicates airflow and can be used during hypopneas to determine whether the hypopnea may be an obstructive apnea.

== Procedure ==
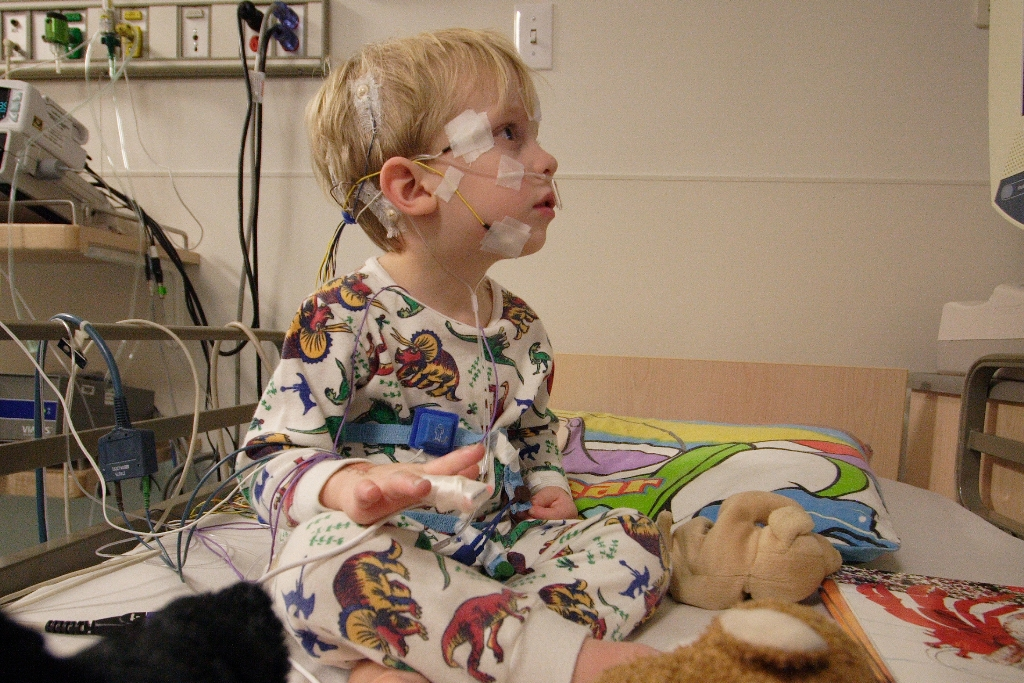
Pediatric polysomnography patient

For the standard test, the patient comes to a sleep lab in the early evening and over the next 1–2 hours is introduced to the setting and "wired up" so that multiple channels of data can be recorded when they fall asleep. The sleep lab may be in a hospital, a free-standing medical office, or a hotel. A sleep technician should always be in attendance and is responsible for attaching the electrodes to the patient and monitoring the patient during the study.

During the study, the technician observes sleep activity by looking at the video monitor and the computer screen that displays all the data second by second. In most labs, the test is completed and the patient is discharged home by 7 a.m. unless a Multiple Sleep Latency Test (MSLT) is to be done during the day to test for excessive daytime sleepiness.

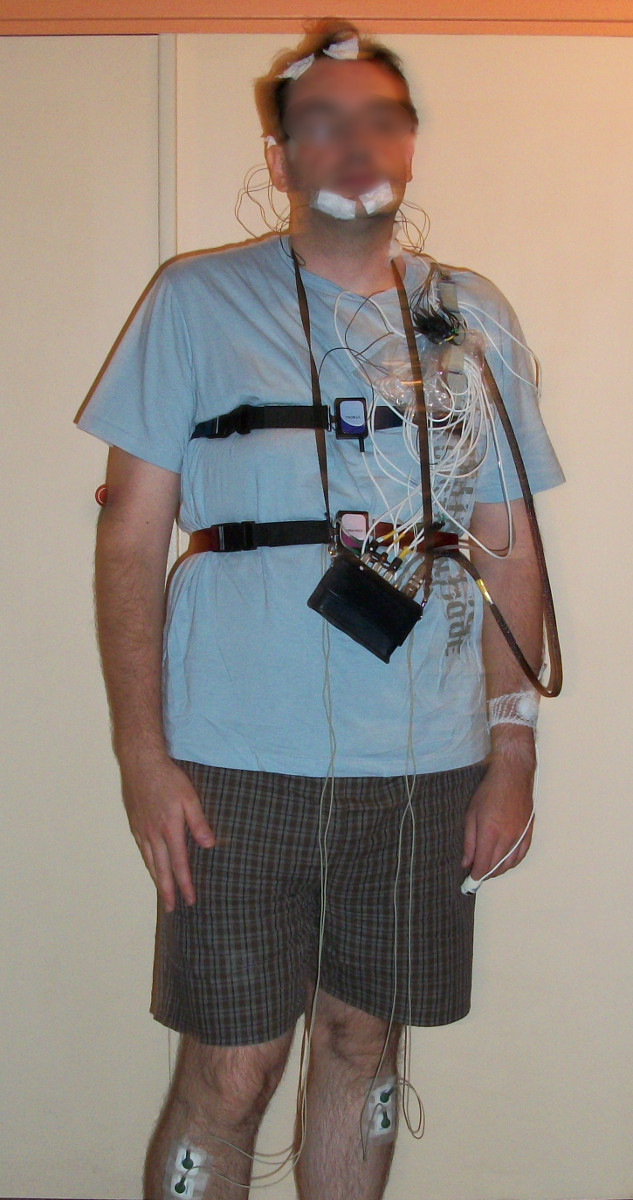
Adult patient, equipped for ambulatory diagnosis

Most recently, health care providers may prescribe home studies to enhance patient comfort and reduce expense. The patient is given instructions after a screening tool is used, uses the equipment at home and returns it the next day. Most screening tools consist of an airflow measuring device (thermistor) and a blood oxygen monitoring device (pulse oximeter). The patient would sleep with the screening device for one to several days, then return the device to the health care provider. The provider would retrieve data from the device and could make assumptions based on the information given. For example, series of drastic blood oxygen desaturations during night periods may indicate some form of respiratory event (apnea). The equipment monitors, at a minimum, oxygen saturation. More sophisticated home study devices have most of the monitoring capability of their counterparts run by sleep lab technicians, and can be complex and time-consuming to set up for self-monitoring.

== Interpretation ==
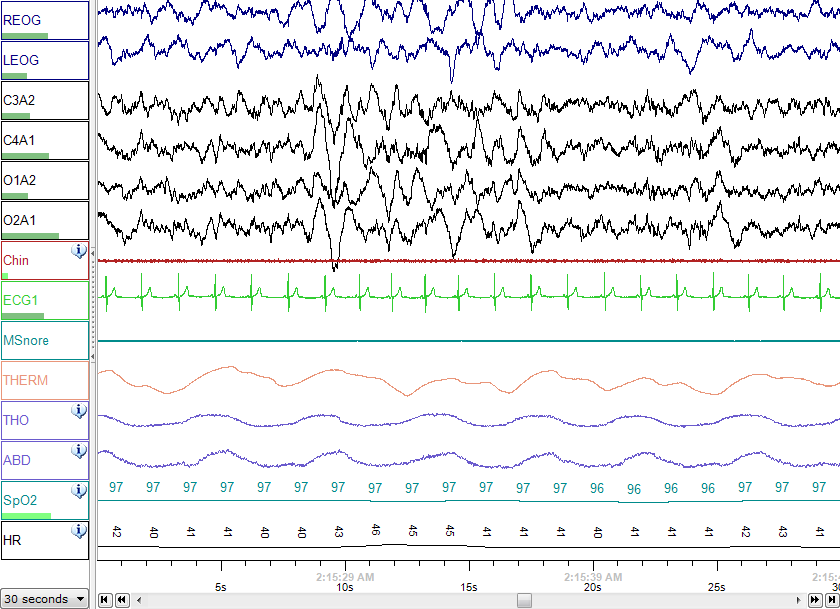
Electrophysiological recordings of stage 3 sleep

After the test is completed, a "scorer" analyzes the data by reviewing the study in 30-second "epochs".

The score consists of the following information:

- Onset of sleep from time the lights were turned off: this is called "sleep onset latency" and normally is less than 20 minutes. (Note that determining "sleep" and "waking" is based solely on the EEG. Patients sometimes feel they were awake when the EEG shows they were sleeping. This may be because of sleep state misperception, drug effects on brain waves, or individual differences in brain waves.)
- Sleep efficiency: the number of minutes of sleep divided by the number of minutes in bed. Normal is approximately 85 to 90% or higher.
- Sleep stages: these are based on 3 sources of data coming from 7 channels: EEG (usually 4 channels), EOG (2), and chin EMG (1). From this information, each 30-second epoch is scored as "awake" or one of 4 sleep stages: 1, 2, 3, and REM, or Rapid Eye Movement, sleep. Stages 1–3 are together called non-REM sleep. Non-REM sleep is distinguished from REM sleep, which is altogether different. Within non-REM sleep, stage 3 is called "slow wave" sleep because of the relatively wide brain waves compared to other stages; another name for stage 3 is "deep sleep". By contrast, stages 1 and 2 are "light sleep". The figures show stage 3 sleep and REM sleep; each figure is a 30-second epoch from an overnight PSG.

(The percentage of each sleep stage varies by age, with decreasing amounts of REM and deep sleep in older people. The majority of sleep at all ages except infancy is stage 2. REM normally occupies about 20-25% of sleep time. Many factors besides age can affect both the amount and percentage of each sleep stage, including drugs [particularly anti-depressants and pain medication], alcohol taken before bedtime, and sleep deprivation.)

- Any breathing irregularities, mainly apneas and hypopneas. Apnea is a complete or near complete cessation of airflow for at least 10 seconds followed by an arousal and/or 3% oxygen desaturation; hypopnea is a 30% or greater decrease in airflow for at least 10 seconds followed by an arousal and/or 4% oxygen desaturation. (The national insurance program Medicare in the US requires a 4% desaturation in order to include the event in the report.)
- "Arousals" are sudden shifts in brain wave activity. They may be caused by numerous factors, including breathing abnormalities, leg movements, environmental noises, etc. An abnormal number of arousals indicates "interrupted sleep" and may explain a person's daytime symptoms of fatigue and/or sleepiness.
- Cardiac rhythm abnormalities.
- Leg movements.
- Body position during sleep.
- Oxygen saturation during sleep.

Once scored, the test recording and the scoring data are sent to the sleep medicine physician for interpretation. Ideally, interpretation is done in conjunction with the medical history, a complete list of drugs the patient is taking, and any other relevant information that might impact the study such as napping done before the test.

After interpreting the data, the sleep physician writes a report that is sent to the referring provider, usually with specific recommendations based on the test results.

== Examples of summary reports ==
The below example report describes a patient's situation and the results of some tests, and mentions CPAP as a treatment for obstructive sleep apnea. CPAP is continuous positive airway pressure and is delivered via a mask to the patient's nose or the patient's nose and mouth. (Some masks cover one, some both.) CPAP is typically prescribed after the diagnosis of OSA is made from a sleep study (i.e., after a PSG test). To determine the correct amount of pressure and the right mask type and size, and also to make sure the patient can tolerate this therapy, a "CPAP titration study" is recommended. This is the same as a PSG but with the addition of the mask applied so the technician can increase the airway pressure inside the mask as needed until all, or most, of the patient's airway obstructions are eliminated.

Mr. J----, age 41, 5'8" tall, 265 lbs., came to the sleep lab to rule out obstructive sleep apnea. He complains of some snoring and daytime sleepiness. His score on the Epworth Sleepiness Scale is elevated at 15 (out of possible 24 points), affirming excessive daytime sleepiness (normal is <10/24).

This single-night diagnostic sleep study shows evidence for obstructive sleep apnea (OSA). For the full night his apnea+hypopnea index was elevated at 18.1 events/hr. (normal <5 events/hr; this is "moderate" OSA). While sleeping supine, his AHI was twice that, at 37.1 events/hr. He also had some oxygen desaturation; for 11% of sleep time his SaO2 was between 80% and 90%.

Results of this study indicate Mr. J---- would benefit from CPAP. To this end, I recommend that he return to the lab for a CPAP titration study.

This report recommends that Mr. J---- return for a CPAP titration study, which means a return to the lab for a second all-night PSG (this one with the mask applied). Often, however, when a patient manifests OSA in the first 2 or 3 hours of the initial PSG, the technician will interrupt the study and apply the mask right then and there; the patient is awakened and fitted for a mask. The rest of the sleep study is then a "CPAP titration." When both the diagnostic PSG and a CPAP titration are done the same night, the entire study is called "split night".

The split-night study has these advantages:

1. The patient only has to come to the lab once, so it is less disruptive than is coming two different nights;
2. It is "half as expensive" to whoever is paying for the study.

The split-night study has these disadvantages:

1. There is less time to make a diagnosis of OSA (Medicare in the US requires a minimum of 2 hours of diagnosis time before the mask can be applied); and
2. There is less time to assure an adequate CPAP titration. If the titration begins with only a few hours of sleep left, the remaining time may not assure a proper CPAP titration, and the patient may still have to return to the lab.

Because of costs, more and more studies for "sleep apnea" are attempted as split-night studies when there is early evidence for OSA. (Note that both types of study, with and without a CPAP mask, are still polysomnograms.) When the CPAP mask is worn, however, the flow-measurement lead in the patient's nose is removed. Instead, the CPAP machine relays all flow-measurement data to the computer. The below is an example report that might be produced from a split night study:

Mr. B____, age 38, 6 ft. tall, 348 lbs., came to the Hospital Sleep Lab to diagnose or rule out obstructive sleep apnea. This polysomnogram consisted of overnight recording of left and right EOG, submental EMG, left and right anterior EMG, central and occipital EEG, EKG, airflow measurement, respiratory effort and pulse oximetry. The test was done without supplemental oxygen. His latency to sleep onset was slightly prolonged at 28.5 minutes. Sleep efficiency was normal at 89.3% (413.5 minutes sleep time out of 463 minutes in bed).

During the first 71 minutes of sleep Mr. B____ manifested 83 obstructive apneas, 3 central apneas, 1 mixed apnea and 28 hypopneas, for an elevated apnea+hypopnea index (AHI) of 97 events/hr (*"severe" OSA). His lowest SaO_{2} during the pre-CPAP period was 72%. CPAP was then applied at 5 cm H_{2}O, and sequentially titrated to a final pressure of 17 cm H_{2}O. At this pressure his AHI was 4 events/hr. and the low SaO_{2} had increased to 89%. This final titration level occurred while he was in REM sleep. Mask used was a Respironics Classic nasal (medium-size).

In summary, this split night study shows severe OSA in the pre-CPAP period, with definite improvement on high levels of CPAP. At 17 cm H_{2}O his AHI was normal at 4 events/hr. and low SaO_{2} was 89%. Based on this split night study I recommend he start on nasal CPAP 17 cm H_{2}O along with heated humidity.

== See also ==
- Polysomnographic technician
- Respiratory monitoring
- Sleep disorder
- Sleep medicine
- Sleep study
