= British Sleep Society =

The British Sleep Society (BSS) was established in 1988 to support clinicians, researchers, nurses, technologists, scientists and students with an interest in sleep and sleep disorders. It acts as an umbrella organisation, with a number of roles and activities. The Society advises health services policy through submitting evidence for consideration by the National Institute for Health and Care Excellence (NICE). It organises an influential scientific meeting each year dedicated to sleep disorders and sleep research and jointly hosts an annual international education course for sleep technologists and clinicians. The Society has charitable status, and operates throughout England, Wales, Northern Ireland and Scotland. It serves the media, fund raisers, commerce and concerned members of the public with support and advice.

== Introduction ==
The British Sleep Society has an inclusive approach to all specialists related to sleep medicine and sleep research. Members include both academic and clinical specialists, particularly neurologists, pulmonologists, psychiatrists, psychologists, pediatricians, geriatricians as well as neurophysiologists, circadian rhythm experts, nurses and a large number of technologists in sleep laboratories.

The Society currently has over 400 members under leadership provided by a 10-member executive board, and a subcommittee coordinates scientific meetings and training courses. The organisation was founded in response to the increase of awareness of sleep apnea and its clinical importance. Over the next few years it broadened to include neurological and physiological interests with strong emphasis on technical aspects and polysomnography. Special interest groups in areas such as pediatrics and actigraphy have been established. It now provides a comprehensive resource to clinical, research and technical specialties.

== Affiliation ==
The Society works with other medical specialist bodies to promote sleep medicine as a medical subspecialty in the UK. The Registration Council for Clinical Physiologists holds a register of practitioners in six disciplines, one of which is sleep physiology. As part of this the Society is a registered professional body within the Council, with the aim to improve the safety of patient care.

The Society is affiliated with the European Sleep Research Society.

== Meetings and training ==
The Society runs an annual spring technologist conference, aimed at providing training in all aspects of sleep medicine. The Society also holds an annual scientific meeting, to listen to presentations on the latest research and clinical developments in sleep and the treatment of sleep disorders. It is the largest meeting in Great Britain dedicated to sleep. The Society has joined forces with the Belgian and Dutch Sleep Societies to organise the International Sleep Medicine Course (ISMC), hosting it every three years. The course is endorsed by the European Sleep Research Society.

== Related fields ==
The British Sleep Society draws from professions in sleep medicine, statistics, psychology, epidemiology, economics, biology, and mathematics.

== See also ==
- Sleep epidemiology
- Sleep Research Society

== In the media ==
- http://home.bt.com/news/uk-news/how-many-hours-sleep-do-you-need-survey-shows-britons-getting-just-five-hours-11364011963848
- https://www.mirror.co.uk/news/uk-news/quarter-brit-workers-less-five-6672090
- http://www.thecourier.co.uk/news/uk/survey-shows-many-of-us-are-getting-just-five-hours-sleep-a-night-1.906092
- https://web.archive.org/web/20151022114451/http://www.westerndailypress.co.uk/Working-age-Britons-hours-night-research-reveals/story-28020304-detail/story.html
