= Sterol regulatory element-binding protein 1 =

Protein-coding gene in the species Homo sapiens

SREBF1
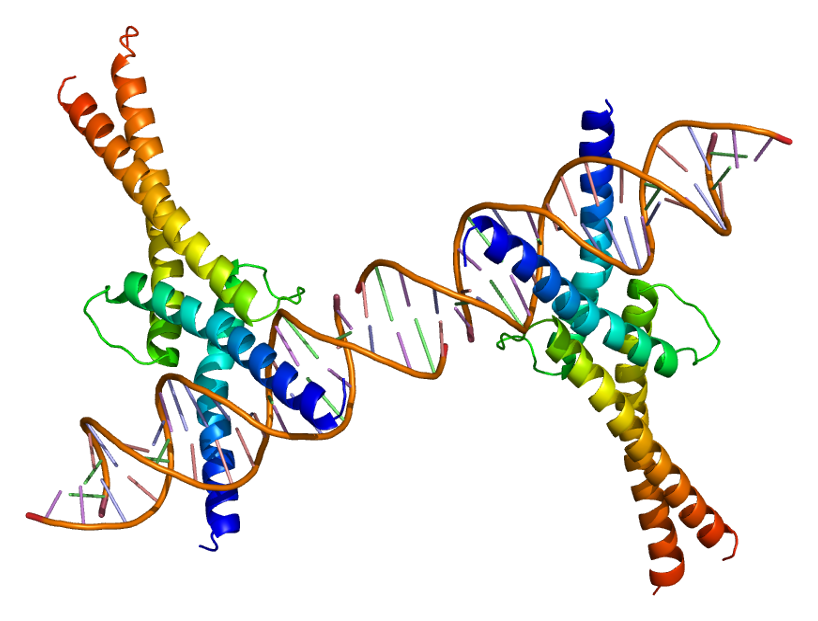

Identifiers
- Aliases: SREBF1, SREBP-1c, SREBP1, bHLHd1, SREBP1a, sterol regulatory element binding transcription factor 1
- External IDs: OMIM: 184756; MGI: 107606; GeneCards: SREBF1
Available structures
PDB	Ortholog search: PDBe RCSB
PDB	List of PDB id codes 1AM9

Gene location (Human)
Chr.	Chromosome 17 (human)
Band	17p11.2	Start	17,810,399 bp
Band	17p11.2	End	17,837,011 bp

Gene location (Mouse)
Chr.	Chromosome 11 (mouse)
Band	11|11 B2	Start	60,089,915 bp
Band	11|11 B2	End	60,113,407 bp
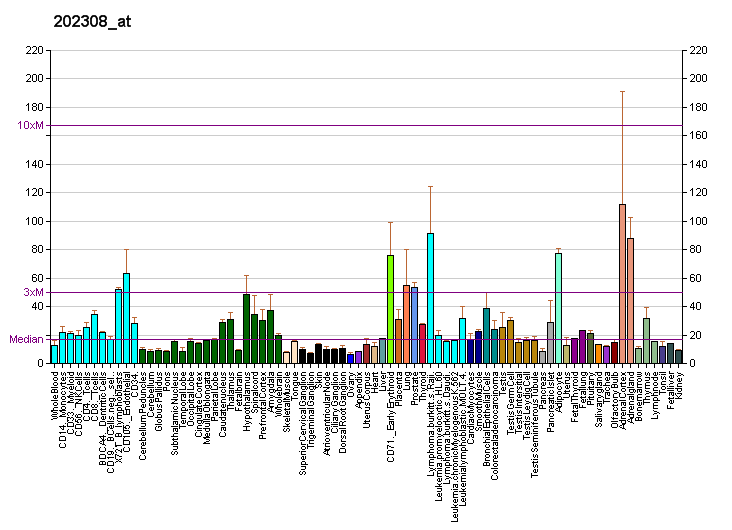
RNA expression pattern
Bgee	Human / Mouse (ortholog); Top expressed in: left adrenal gland; right adrenal gland; left adrenal cortex; right adrenal cortex; right lobe of liver; left uterine tube; minor salivary glands; tibial nerve; anterior pituitary; right ovary / Top expressed in: white adipose tissue; lip; neural layer of retina; urinary bladder; exocrine gland; hepatobiliary system; liver; skeletal muscle tissue; olfactory bulb; islet of Langerhans; More reference expression data
BioGPS	More reference expression data
Gene ontology
Molecular function	DNA binding; sequence-specific DNA binding; protein dimerization activity; DNA-binding transcription factor activity; sterol response element binding; chromatin binding; RNA polymerase II cis-regulatory region sequence-specific DNA binding; transcription factor activity, RNA polymerase II core promoter proximal region sequence-specific binding; protein binding; protein kinase binding; RNA polymerase II transcription regulatory region sequence-specific DNA binding; nuclear receptor activity; DNA-binding transcription factor activity, RNA polymerase II-specific; DNA-binding transcription activator activity, RNA polymerase II-specific; protein-containing complex binding; enzyme activator activity
Cellular component	cytoplasm; integral component of membrane; cytosol; Golgi apparatus; nuclear envelope; endoplasmic reticulum membrane; membrane; intracellular membrane-bounded organelle; Golgi membrane; nucleoplasm; endoplasmic reticulum; ER to Golgi transport vesicle membrane; cytoplasmic vesicle; nucleus; protein-containing complex
Biological process	positive regulation of histone deacetylation; insulin receptor signaling pathway; positive regulation of triglyceride biosynthetic process; steroid metabolic process; negative regulation of insulin secretion; response to fatty acid; lipid biosynthetic process; response to glucagon; regulation of protein stability; regulation of transcription, DNA-templated; response to retinoic acid; response to organic cyclic compound; lung development; lipid metabolism; regulation of insulin secretion; regulation of transcription by RNA polymerase II; cellular response to starvation; response to progesterone; ageing; response to peptide hormone; mRNA transcription by RNA polymerase II; cholesterol metabolic process; negative regulation of transcription by RNA polymerase II; response to glucose; transcription, DNA-templated; positive regulation of transcription, DNA-templated; response to lipid; cellular response to fatty acid; regulation of autophagy of mitochondrion; regulation of protein targeting to mitochondrion; regulation of fatty acid metabolic process; circadian rhythm; cellular response to insulin stimulus; response to food; positive regulation of cholesterol biosynthetic process; response to cAMP; regulation of heart rate by chemical signal; fat cell differentiation; intracellular receptor signaling pathway; positive regulation of transcription by RNA polymerase II; regulation of cholesterol biosynthetic process; transcription by RNA polymerase II; positive regulation of pri-miRNA transcription by RNA polymerase II; positive regulation of catalytic activity
Sources:Amigo / QuickGO
Orthologs
Databases	NCBI: entry; OMA: entry
Species	Human	Mouse
Entrez	6720	20787
Ensembl	ENSG00000072310	ENSMUSG00000020538
UniProt	P36956	Q9WTN3
RefSeq (mRNA)	NM_001005291; NM_004176; NM_001321096	NM_011480; NM_001313979; NM_001358314; NM_001358315
RefSeq (protein)	NP_001005291; NP_001308025; NP_004167	NP_001300908; NP_035610; NP_001345243; NP_001345244
Location (UCSC)	Chr 17: 17.81 – 17.84 Mb	Chr 11: 60.09 – 60.11 Mb
PubMed search
- Wikidata
View/Edit Human	View/Edit Mouse

Sterol regulatory element-binding transcription factor 1 (SREBF1) also known as sterol regulatory element-binding protein 1 (SREBP-1) is a protein that in humans is encoded by the SREBF1 gene.

This gene is located within the Smith–Magenis syndrome region on chromosome 17. Two transcript variants encoding different isoforms have been found for this gene. The isoforms are SREBP-1a and SREBP-1c (the latter also called ADD-1). SREBP-1a is expressed in the intestine and spleen, whereas SREBP-1c is mainly expressed in liver, muscle, and fat (among other tissues).

== Expression ==
The proteins encoded by this gene are transcription factors that bind to a sequence in the promoter of different genes, called sterol regulatory element-1 (SRE1). This element is a decamer (oligomer with ten subunits) flanking the LDL receptor gene and other genes involved in, for instance, sterol biosynthesis. The protein is synthesized as a precursor that is attached to the nuclear membrane and endoplasmic reticulum. Following cleavage, the mature protein translocates to the nucleus and activates transcription by binding to the SRE1. Sterols inhibit the cleavage of the precursor, and the mature nuclear form is rapidly catabolized, thereby reducing transcription. The protein is a member of the basic helix-loop-helix-leucine zipper (bHLH-Zip) transcription factor family.

SREBP-1a regulates genes related to lipid and cholesterol production and its activity is regulated by sterol levels in the cell.

SREBP-1a and SREBP-1c are both encoded by the same gene, but are transcribed by different promoters. For animals in a fasted state, SREBP-1c expression is suppressed in the liver, but a high carbohydrate meal (by insulin release) strongly induces SREBP-1c expression.

== Function ==
SREBP-1 plays a key role in the induction of lipogenesis by the liver. mTORC1 is activated by insulin (a hormone of nutrient abundance) leading to increased production of SREBP-1c, which facilitates storage of fatty acids (excess nutrients) as triglycerides.

== Clinical relevance ==
SREBP-1c regulates genes required for glucose metabolism and fatty acid and lipid production and its expression is induced by insulin. Insulin-stimulated SREBP-1c increases glycolysis by activation of glucokinase enzyme, and increases lipogenesis (conversion of carbohydrates into fatty acids). Insulin stimulation of SREBP-1c is mediated by liver X receptor (LXR) and mTORC1.

High blood levels of insulin due to insulin resistance often leads to steatosis in the liver because of SREBP-1 activation. Suppression of SREBP-1c by sirtuin 1 or by other means protects against development of fatty liver.

SREBP-1 is highly activated in cancers because tumor cells require lipids for cell membranes, second messengers, and energy.

== Interactions ==
SREBF1 has been shown to interact with:

- CREB-binding protein,
- DAX1
- LMNA, and
- TWIST2.
- BHLHE40
- BHLHE41

== See also ==
- Sterol regulatory element-binding protein
