= GPRA =

GPRA may refer to:

- Godofredo P. Ramos Airport, in the Philippines
- Government Performance and Results Act, a United States law enacted in 1993
- Provisional Government of the Algerian Republic (French: Gouvernement provisoire de la République algérienne), 1958–1962
- G protein-coupled receptor for asthma susceptibility, an alternative name of the neuropeptide S receptor (NPSR)
