= Sleeping Girl =

Sleeping Girl may refer to:

- Sleeping Girl (Lichtenstein painting)
- Sleeping Girl (17th century painting)
- "The Sleeping Girl", an episode of Strange Experiences
