= SHA-68 =

Chemical compound

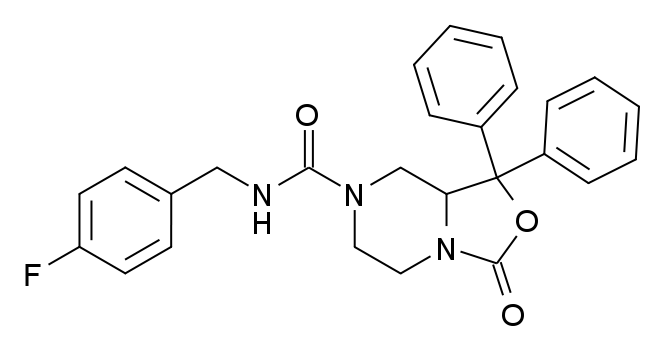

Clinical data
- ATC code: none

Identifiers
- IUPAC name: N-[(4-fluorophenyl)methyl]-3-oxo-1,1-diphenyl-5,6,8,8a-tetrahydro-[1,3]oxazolo[3,4-a]pyrazine-7-carboxamide
- CAS Number: 847553-89-3
- PubChem CID: 11374217
- IUPHAR/BPS: 5813
- ChemSpider: 9549134
- UNII: 8Q99A974BL
- ChEMBL: ChEMBL469695
- CompTox Dashboard (EPA): DTXSID801028552

Chemical and physical data
- Formula: C_{26}H_{24}FN_{3}O_{3}
- Molar mass: 445.494 g·mol^{−1}
- 3D model (JSmol): Interactive image
- SMILES: c4ccccc4C1(c5ccccc5)OC(=O)N3C1CN(CC3)C(=O)NCc(cc2)ccc2F
- InChI: InChI=1S/C26H24FN3O3/c27-22-13-11-19(12-14-22)17-28-24(31)29-15-16-30-23(18-29)26(33-25(30)32,20-7-3-1-4-8-20)21-9-5-2-6-10-21/h1-14,23H,15-18H2,(H,28,31); Key:SFRQIPRTNYHJHP-UHFFFAOYSA-N

SHA-68 is a drug which acts as a selective, non-peptide antagonist at the neuropeptide S receptor NPSR. In animal studies it reduced motor stereotypes, and blocks the stimulant action of neuropeptide S.

== Synthesis ==
The synthesis of SHA-68 was shown in a patent (ref example 1, Ex 1, Ex 2, Ex 16).

The Grignard reaction between Methyl 2-piperazine carboxylate [2758-98-7] (1) and phenylmagnesium bromide [100-58-3] (2) occurs to give alpha,alpha-Diphenyl-2-piperazinemethanol [17532-20-6] (3). {This compound is called Azapipradrol}. Protection of the sterically more accessible piperazine nitrogen with Boc anhydride occurs to give PC23122074 (4). Treatment with ethyl chloroformate [541-41-3] (5) gives the cyclic urethane and hence, PC68420957 (6). Deprotection of the Boc group in the presence of trifluoroacetic acid gave 1,1-Diphenyltetrahydro-1H-oxazolo[3,4-a]pyrazin-3(5H)-one [847555-93-5] [847556-28-9] (7). Lastly, treatment with 4-fluorophenyl isocyanate [1195-45-5] (8) gave the substituted urea, thus completing the synthesis of SHA-68 (9).

SAR reveals similarity to RTI-118 and contains the same precursor.

== See also ==
- Neuropeptide S receptor
