= BHLHE41 =

Protein-coding gene in humans

Identifiers
- Aliases: BHLHE41, DEC2, SHARP1, BHLHe41, HDEC2, SHARP-1, BHLHB3, Basic Helix-Loop-Helix Family Member E41, Basic Helix-Loop-Helix Family, Member E41, Class E Basic Helix-Loop-Helix Protein 41, Class B Basic Helix-Loop-Helix Protein 3, Basic Helix-Loop-Helix Domain Containing, Class B, 3, Differentially Expressed In Chondrocytes 2, Differentially Expressed In Chondrocytes Protein 2, Enhancer-Of-Split And Hairy-Related Protein 1, FNSS1
- External IDs: OMIM: 606200; MGI: 1930704; GeneCards: BHLHE41

Gene location (Human)
Chr.	Chromosome 12 (human)
Band	12p12.1	Start	26,120,030 bp
Band	12p12.1	End	26,125,037 bp

Gene location (Mouse)
Chr.	Chromosome 6 (mouse)
Band	6 G3|6 77.7 cM	Start	145,803,969 bp
Band	6 G3|6 77.7 cM	End	145,811,284 bp
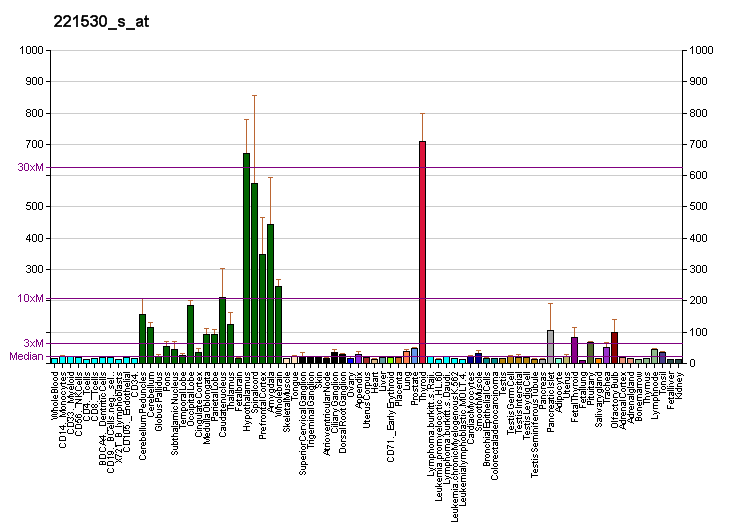
RNA expression pattern
Bgee	Human / Mouse (ortholog); Top expressed in: right uterine tube; inferior ganglion of vagus nerve; Achilles tendon; optic nerve; subthalamic nucleus; spinal cord; C1 segment; corpus callosum; pars reticulata; external globus pallidus / Top expressed in: neural layer of retina; muscle of thigh; zygote; superior frontal gyrus; primary visual cortex; cerebellar cortex; dentate gyrus of hippocampal formation granule cell; skeletal muscle tissue; interventricular septum; lip; More reference expression data
BioGPS	More reference expression data
Gene ontology
Molecular function	DNA binding; protein dimerization activity; protein homodimerization activity; MRF binding; transcription corepressor activity; histone deacetylase binding; RNA polymerase II cis-regulatory region sequence-specific DNA binding; DNA-binding transcription repressor activity, RNA polymerase II-specific; bHLH transcription factor binding; E-box binding; protein binding; protein heterodimerization activity; transcription factor activity, RNA polymerase II distal enhancer sequence-specific binding; DNA-binding transcription factor activity, RNA polymerase II-specific; RNA polymerase II transcription regulatory region sequence-specific DNA binding; transcription factor binding; sequence-specific DNA binding; sequence-specific double-stranded DNA binding
Cellular component	nucleus
Biological process	cell differentiation; regulation of transcription, DNA-templated; rhythmic process; negative regulation of transcription by competitive promoter binding; negative regulation of transcription by RNA polymerase II; circadian regulation of gene expression; transcription, DNA-templated; negative regulation of myotube differentiation; animal organ morphogenesis; cell population proliferation; negative regulation of transcription, DNA-templated; circadian rhythm; somitogenesis; Notch signaling pathway; regulation of neurogenesis; anterior/posterior pattern specification
Sources:Amigo / QuickGO
Orthologs
Databases	NCBI: entry; OMA: entry
Species	Human	Mouse
Entrez	79365	79362
Ensembl	ENSG00000123095	ENSMUSG00000030256
UniProt	Q9C0J9	Q99PV5
RefSeq (mRNA)	NM_030762	NM_001271768; NM_024469
RefSeq (protein)	NP_110389	NP_001258697; NP_077789
Location (UCSC)	Chr 12: 26.12 – 26.13 Mb	Chr 6: 145.8 – 145.81 Mb
PubMed search
- Wikidata
View/Edit Human	View/Edit Mouse

"Basic helix-loop-helix family, member e41", or BHLHE41, is a gene that encodes a basic helix-loop-helix transcription factor repressor protein in various tissues of both humans and mice. It is also known as DEC2, hDEC2, and SHARP1, and was previously known as "basic helix-loop-helix domain containing, class B, 3", or BHLHB3. BHLHE41 is known for its role in the circadian molecular mechanisms that influence sleep quantity as well as its role in immune function and the maturation of T helper type 2 cell lineages associated with humoral immunity.

== History ==
Klaus-Armin Nave's lab identified BHLHE41/SHARP1 and BHLHE40/SHARP2 as a novel subfamily in the basic helix-loop-helix (BHLH) protein family. They differentiated BHLHE41/SHARP1 and BHLHE40/SHARP2 from other BHLH-protein encoding genes since they are not transcribed until the end of embryonic development. The DNA sequence of BHLHE41 was first obtained by Dr. Yukia Kato's lab through a cDNA library search. Particularly, they obtained the sequence of BHLHE40/DEC1 and conducted an expressed sequence tag (EST) search to identify the BHLHE41/DEC2 sequence. BHLHE41/DEC2 and BHLHE40/DEC1 share 97% homology in the BHLH domain. After the identification of the BHLHE41 gene, Dr. Ken-Ichi Honma's lab characterized its role as a regulator in the mammalian circadian clock. The role of BHLHE41 in other pathways is still being fully characterized.

== Structure ==
BHLHE41 is a member of the DEC subfamily within the basic helix-loop-helix (bHLH) proteins gene family. BHLHE41 was mapped to human chromosome 12: 26,120,026-26-125-127 reverse strand and has a total length of 5,101 base pairs. The gene is also mapped to 6 G2-G3 on the mouse chromosome, and 4q43 distal-q4 on the rat chromosome respectively. BHLHE41 has 3 known splice variants. BHLHE41-002 and BHLHE41-003 are retained introns and do not code for a protein. BHLHE41-001 contains 5 coding exons, has a transcript length of 3,837 base pairs, and encodes the 482 amino acid BHLHE41 protein. BHLHE40 is the paralogue of BHLHE41. BHLHE41 currently has 165 known orthologs.

The BHLHE41 protein has a myc-type, basic helix-loop-helix (bHLH) domain and an orange domain. The orange domain is a 30 residue sequence located on the carboxy-terminal end relative to the BHLH domain of the protein whose function is still unclear. The basic helix-loop-helix domain allows members of the protein family to dimerize with each other to affect gene transcription through binding to specific DNA sequences. BHLHE41 protein also has alanine and glycine-rich regions in the C-terminal, and lacks the WRPW motif for interaction with the corepressor Groucho.

BHLHE41 recruits the histone methyltransferase G9a and histone deacetylases HDAC1 and Sirt1 to mediate chromatin modifications that repress target gene expression.

== Function ==
=== Circadian ===
BHLHE41 is expressed in the suprachiasmatic nucleus with levels peaking during subjective day. The gene encodes for a transcription factor that belongs to the Hairy/Enhancer of Split (Hes) subfamily of basic helix-loop-helix factor genes which encode transcriptional repressors that function as downstream targets to regulate cell fate during tissue development. BHLHE41 acts as a transcriptional repressor and as a regulator of the Circadian clock. In the clock, the transcriptional factors Clock and Bmal form a heterodimer. This heterodimer binds to the E-Box promoter element, thereby promoting transcription of downstream genes such as Per and BHLHe41. After transcription and translation, the protein product of BHLHE41 (DEC2) reenters the nucleus and competes with Clock-Bmal1 heterodimer for E-Box element binding (through competitive inhibition); this acts as a suppressor for per gene transcription.

=== Non-circadian ===
BHLHE41 has also been implicated in multiple other pathways. Deregulation of BHLHE41 transcription levels has been characterized as a marker in the progression of several cancers. Low levels of BHLHE41 transcript has been associated with tumor growth suggesting that BHLHE41 suppresses tumor proliferation; however, no definite mechanism of action has been discovered. Dec2 has also been hypothesized to be involved in the regulation of immune responses. Further research on characterizing these pathways and BHLHE41's specific role is still being conducted.

In mice lacking SHARP1/BHLHE41 and SHARP2, IGF-2 is elevated and leads to enhanced memory consolidation.

== Mutations ==
A mutation causing familial natural short sleep in one affected family was identified. However, subsequent biobank research showed that other carriers of this mutation or of different high-impact mutations in the same gene did not exhibit any change in sleep duration, indicating that the cause of the short sleeper phenotype in this family had a different basis.

=== DEC2-P385R ===
A mutation causing familial natural short sleep in one affected family was identified. However, subsequent research showed that other carriers of this mutation or of different high-impact mutations in the same gene did not exhibit any change in sleep duration, indicating that the cause of the short sleeper phenotype in this family had a different basis.

This point mutation substitutes C to G in DEC2/BHLHE41 DNA sequence results in the substitution of proline at position 384 with arginine. The proline residue is located close to the C-terminal histone deacetylase-interacting region of BHLHE41, which is a highly conserved region within the proline-rich domain. This mutation mitigates BHLHe41's transcriptional inhibitory function. These effects are not seen in BHLHE41 knockout mice.

=== BHLHE41 knockout ===
BHLHE41 knockout mice, also known as BHLHE41 -/- or BHLHE41 null, showed no change in their free-running period with respect to activity. After being exposed to an in vivo model of allergic asthma, BHLHE41 knockout mice show decreased TH2 cytokine production, defective TH2 responses after being repeatedly stimulated with OVA peptide, and reduced alveolar infiltrate. BHLHE41 knockout mice had increased post-natal regeneration of muscle after injury. However, these mice showed no deficits in embryonic muscle repair.

== Clinical significance ==
=== Immune system ===
BHLHE41 has been shown to be regulator of T-cell activation. BHLHE41 upregulates CD25 expression through a Stat6-dependent mechanism, which enhances the IL-2 receptor-mediated signal pathway, which promotes TH2 differentiation. Gata3 enhances T helper cell 2 (Th2) differentiation signals by regulating BHLHE41 expression through an autoregulatory loop.

=== Hypoxia ===
Hypoxia stimulates hypoxia-inducible factor-1 alpha (HIF-1α) to be produced, which initiates the hypoxic response. HIF-1α induces the transcription of BHLHE41 and BHLHE40. This is believed to repress cell proliferation, which is not conducive to a hypoxic environment. BHLHE41 can also block a hypoxic response by presenting HIF-1α to a proteasome complex, which induces HIF-1α's degradation.

=== Muscle ===
BHLHE41 has been shown to repress myogenic differentiation by inhibiting MyoD activity through multiple mechanisms. When BHLHE41 dimerizes with MyoD and E47, it prevents the formation of MyoD-E47 heterodimers, which are functional. When BHLHE41 is sumoylated at K240 and K255, it recruits the histone methyltransferase G9a. G9a then catalyzes repressive histone 3 lysine 9 dimethylation (H3K9me2) at promoter sites of target genes of MyoD. G9a also methylates MyoD, which inhibits MyoD's transcriptional activity.

BHLHE41 and BHLHE40 are transcriptional targets of SREBP-1 (also known as ADD-1) isoforms SREBP-1a and SREBP-1c. After being induced by SREBP-1, BHLHE41 and BHLHE40 have been shown to repress myogenesis by blocking MYOD1 transcription. BHLHE40 and BHLHE41 are also known to alter the expression of several contractile proteins and mitochondrial proteins in skeletal muscle. BHLHE41 and BHLHE40 also repress SREBP-1. This forms a negative feedback loop between SREBP-1, BHLHE40, and BHLHE41 in muscles that runs on a 24-hour circadian cycle, which has a 12-hour offset between SREBP-1 and BHLHE40/BHLHE41. In addition, BHLHE41 is known to inhibit inflammation and adipogenic differentiation in muscles.

=== Sarcoma, oral cancer, liver cancer, and colon cancer ===
BHLHE41 has been shown to suppress the expression of vascular endothelial growth factor (VEGF) in sarcoma cells and oral cancer cells. BHLHE41 also suppresses cytochrome P450 2D6 (CYP2D6) in hepatocellular carcinoma cells. While BHLHE40 induces apoptosis, senescence, and epithelial-mesenchymal transition (EMT) in tumor cells, BHLHE41 shows a circadian expression and inhibits EMT, apoptosis, and metastasis in sarcoma cells and hepatocellular carcinoma cells. It has been shown that the normal tissue adjacent to colon carcinomas show high levels of BHLHE41 expression. Research is currently examining whether BHLHE40 and BHLHE41 can be used as target genes for chemotherapy.

=== Breast cancer ===
BHLHE41 is thought to be a critical regulator of the metastasis of triple-negative-breast cancer (TNBC). Regulated by the p63 metastasis suppressor, BHLHE41 inhibits TNBC through the inhibition of HIF-1α and hypoxia-inducible factor 2α (HIF-2α). Studies have shown that BHLHE41 is both required and sufficient to limit the expression of HIF-target genes, by mechanistically binding to HIFs and promoting proteasomal degradation. Breast cancer tumors that show high expression of BHLHE41 and CyclinG2 are believed to have a lower metastatic risk.
