= Neuropeptide S =

Protein-coding gene in the species Homo sapiens

NPS

Identifiers
- Aliases: NPS, neuropeptide S
- External IDs: OMIM: 609513; MGI: 3642232; HomoloGene: 106066; GeneCards: NPS; OMA:NPS - orthologs

Gene location (Human)
| Chr. | Chromosome 10 (human) |
| Band | 10q26.2 | Start | 127,549,309 bp |
| Band | 10q26.2 | End | 127,553,540 bp |

Gene location (Mouse)
| Chr. | Chromosome 7 (mouse) |
| Band | 7|7 F3 | Start | 134,860,432 bp |
| Band | 7|7 F3 | End | 134,874,671 bp |
RNA expression pattern
| Bgee | Human / Mouse (ortholog); Top expressed in: testicle; islet of Langerhans; prefrontal cortex; substantia nigra; hypothalamus; temporal lobe; amygdala / Top expressed in: embryo; embryo; spermatocyte; testicle; genital tubercle; hypothalamus; cerebellar cortex; spermatid; More reference expression data |
| BioGPS | n/a |
Orthologs
| Species | Human | Mouse |
| Entrez | 594857 | 100043254 |
| Ensembl | ENSG00000214285 | ENSMUSG00000073804 |
| UniProt | P0C0P6 | P0C0P8 |
| RefSeq (mRNA) | NM_001030013 | NM_001163611 |
| RefSeq (protein) | NP_001025184 | NP_001157083 |
| Location (UCSC) | Chr 10: 127.55 – 127.55 Mb | Chr 7: 134.86 – 134.87 Mb |
| PubMed search |
- Wikidata
| View/Edit Human | View/Edit Mouse |

Neuropeptide S (NPS) is a neuropeptide found in human and mammalian brain, mainly produced by neurons in the amygdala and between Barrington's nucleus and the locus coeruleus, although NPS-responsive neurons extend projections into many other brain areas. NPS binds specifically to a G protein-coupled receptor, NPSR. Animal studies show that NPS suppresses anxiety and appetite, induces wakefulness and hyperactivity, and plays a significant role in the extinction of conditioned fear. It has also been shown to significantly enhance dopamine activity in the mesolimbic pathway, and inhibits motility and increases permeability in neurocrine fashion acting through NO in the myenteric plexus in rats and humans.

== Synthetic ligands ==
The non-peptide NPS receptor antagonist SHA-68 blocks the effects of NPS in animals and is anxiogenic. Several peptide derived NPS agonists and antagonists have also been developed.

== Peptide sequence ==
Below are the sequences of mature neuropeptide S in several representative species in which it is expressed:

Neuropeptide S

Identifiers
- Symbol: Neuropeptide_S
- Pfam: PF14993
- InterPro: IPR028138
Available protein structures:
- Pfam: structures / ECOD
- PDB: RCSB PDB; PDBe; PDBj
- PDBsum: structure summary

| species | sequence | MW |
|---|---|---|
| human | SFRNGVGTGMKKTSFQRAKS | 2187.5 |
| rat | SFRNGVGSGVKKTSFRRAKQ | 2210.5 |
| mouse | SFRNGVGSGAKKTSFRRAKQ | 2182.5 |
| dog, chimp | SFRNGVGTGMKKTSFRRAKS | 2215.6 |
| chicken | SFRNGVGSGIKKTSFRRAKS | 2183.5 |
| consensus | SFRNGVGxGXKKTSFxRAKx | N/A |

According to Pfam's HMM logo, there is a conserved "KR" cleave site immediately N-terminal to the C-terminal mature peptide.
