= Familial natural short sleep =

- This condition is inherited as an autosomal dominant trait.
- Specialty: Medical genetics
- Causes: Genetic mutation
- Prevention: none

Familial natural short sleep is a rare, genetic, typically inherited trait where an individual sleeps for fewer hours than average without suffering from daytime sleepiness or other consequences of sleep deprivation. This process is entirely natural in this kind of individual, and it is caused by certain genetic mutations. A person with this trait is known as a "natural short sleeper".

This condition is not to be confused with intentional sleep deprivation, which leaves symptoms such as irritability or temporarily impaired cognitive abilities in people who are predisposed to sleep a normal amount of time but not in people with FNSS.

This sleep type is not considered to be a genetic disorder nor are there any known harmful effects to overall health associated with it; therefore it is considered to be a genetic, benign trait.

== Presentation ==
=== Signs ===
Individuals with this trait are known for having the life-long ability of being able to sleep for a lesser amount of time than average people, usually 4 to 6 hours (less than the average sleeptime of 8 hours) each night while waking up feeling relatively well-rested, they also have a notable absence of any sort of consequence that derives from depriving oneself of sleep, something an average person would not be able to do on the sleeptime (and the frequency of said sleeptime) that is common for people with FNSS.

Another common trait among people with familial natural short sleep is an increased ability at recalling memories. Other common traits include outgoing personality, high productiveness, lower body mass index than average (possibly due to faster metabolism), higher resilience and heightened pain tolerance. All of these traits are of slightly better quality in people with natural short sleep than in people with natural normal sleep, essentially making them slightly more efficient than average people.

=== Onset ===
This condition is life-long, meaning that a natural short sleeper has naturally slept for a shorter time than average for most, if not all, of their lives.

=== Inheritance ===
This trait is inherited as an autosomal dominant trait, which means that for a person to be a natural short sleeper, they must have at least one copy of a mutation related to this condition, this mutation must have been either inherited or it must have arisen from a spontaneous genetic error. A carrier for a mutation associated with FNSS has a 50% chance of transmitting the mutation to one of their offspring.

== Complications ==
This condition has no known health complications associated with it.

A study done in 2001 showed that natural short sleepers are more prone to subclinical hypomania, a temporary mental state most common during adolescence characterized by racing thoughts, abnormally high focus on goal-directed activities, unusually euphoric mood, and a perceptual innecessity for sleep.

== Genetics ==
Early research, particularly from the lab of Ying-Hui Fu, named several mutations as causing heritable short sleep in studied families. These mutations implicated the genes DEC2/BHLHE41, ADRB1, NPSR1, and GRM1. However, subsequent biobank research showed that other carriers of these mutations or of different high-impact mutations in the same genes do not exhibit any reduction in sleep duration. This indicates that the short sleeper phenotype in the original case reports had a different basis.

Current genome-wide association studies suggest that sleep behaviors such as sleep length are highly polygenic, with most heritability explained by variants with small effects. The largest non-pathogenic genetic effect on sleep duration found to date is a change of 2.44 or 3.24 minutes associated with variation in the PAX8 gene.

== Diagnosis ==
Diagnosis is usually not necessary, as this trait is not considered a disorder in and of itself; however, there are various methods one's doctor can use to diagnose the condition, including but not limited to the use of questionnaires such as the morningness-eveningness questionnaire, the Munich chronotype questionnaire, etc. Clinical diagnostic methods for the condition include electroencephalograms, delta-power analyses, and genetic testing.

=== Differential diagnosis ===
There are other conditions similar to this specific trait that share some characteristics between each other, these include:

- Advanced sleep phase syndrome, this is a rare condition affecting the circadian rhythm in which individuals have an early sleep onset and equally early sleep awakening that is part of their regular sleep schedule. While both sleep traits are similar in the sense of early awakening, patients with FASP typically spend the same amount of time (8 hours) sleeping as an average person, while patients with FNSS do not. Another difference between the two is that early sleep onset is not a feature shown by people with familial natural short sleep. Like familial natural short sleep, it has the tendency to be hereditary.
- Delayed sleep phase syndrome, this is a more common circadian rhythm condition (estimated to affect around 16% of adolescents in the U.S.) characterized by late sleep onset and equally late sleep awakening. While both sleep traits are similar in the sense of late sleep-onset, individuals with FNSS do not suffer from late sleep awakening. Unlike FNSS, this condition is not highly heritable, but it does seem to have at least some genetic component linked to it.

List of conditions that may be confused with FNSS include:

- Insomnia, this is a common sleep disorder which can be acute or chronic and is characterized by an individual's difficulty to fall asleep, this usually leads to them to stay up late involuntarily which shortens their sleep time. While insomnia and FNSS share some common features (late sleep onset, for example), those with insomnia do suffer from the consequences associated with sleep deprivation, something people with FNSS do not suffer from, as they actually have a resistance against them.

== Prevalence ==
While some surveys estimate that 1% to 3% of the population self-report thriving on fewer than 6 hours of sleep, geneticists have found that true, genetically verified cases of Familial Natural Short Sleep are exceptionally rare, documented in only a small handful of families worldwide. In the U.S., natural short sleepers are a small part of a larger group comprising 30–35% of the population who sleep less than recommended.

== Notable examples ==
Former U.K. Prime Minister Margaret Thatcher was known to sleep very little and often would survive on as little as four hours of sleep per night. Some have attributed this to familiar natural short sleep due to a genetic mutation in gene DEC2.

U.S. President Donald Trump is alleged to sleep roughly four to five hours per night. However, it is not known whether this is due to a genetic predisposition or simply by choice.

== Familial natural short sleep and Alzheimer's disease ==
For some unknown reason, individuals with this condition (and their associated mutations) might be genetically protected against neurodegenerative disorders, mainly those that cause dementia, such as Alzheimer's disease.

Ying-Hui Fu did a study using animal mouse models who were genetically engineered to carry mutations associated with natural short sleep and mutations associated with an increased risk of suffering from dementia; the results showed that mice with both FNSS and dementia mutations did not show as much symptoms of dementia as their dementia-alone predisposed mice counterparts. The same mice who had both Alzheimer's and short sleep gene mutations also had lesser amounts of Aβ plaque depositions in their hippocampuses and brain cortexes than those who only carried the Alzheimer's mutations. The FNSS-related mutations that were used in the study were DEC2-P384R and NPSR1-Y206H, and the Alzheimer's disease-related mutations were PS19 and 5XFAD.

== See also ==
- Sleep apnea
- Sleep epigenetics
- Fatal familial insomnia
- Hypersomnia
- Sleep paralysis
- Sleep walking
- Parasomnia
