= Sleep epidemiology =

Sleep epidemiology is an emerging branch of the discipline of epidemiology. It is a growing field of scientific enquiry, with the first documented modern epidemiological survey being conducted in 1979.

There is extensive interest in sleep research in the UK, Europe and worldwide. In the UK and US this manifests itself in research centres which often have sleep laboratories where the sleep patterns and conditions of individuals can be observed, as well as the effect of various treatments. Similarly assessment and treatment of sleep disorders is evident in health care and clinical centres, sometimes in partnership with universities.

== Introduction ==
There is growing recognition of the importance of sleep on our health and well-being. The field of research into sleep has been mostly led by the discipline of psychology, focussing for example on rapid eye movement sleep, dreaming and memory consolidation studies. Clinical and medical professionals have taken less interest in the causes and consequences of good and poor sleep. It is often used as a sign of existing disease, such as depression. More recently Pulmonology has developed methods for identifying sleep-disordered breathing, such as obstructive sleep apnea.

As a consequence the field of sleep medicine has become an increasingly popular sub-specialty of medicine. In order to provide evidence for this medical specialty, sleep epidemiology provides data on the incidence and prevalence of good and poor sleep. This then allows the collection of evidence for the causes and consequences of the quantity and quality of sleep in the population. Studies provide the direction for research into interventions on sleep to improve health and well-being. The US dominates in this field. Sleep epidemiology has provided evidence for the association between sleep and various diseases, particularly metabolic and cardiovascular diseases, such as diabetes and cardiovascular disease. It is also related to known risk factors for disease such as obesity.

== Related fields ==
Sleep epidemiology draws upon fields such as: sleep medicine, statistics, psychology, epidemiology, economics, biology, and mathematics

== Journals ==
- Stanford Journal of Sleep Epidemiology

== See also ==
- Epidemiology
- Sleep
