= BHLHE40 =

Protein-coding gene in humans

Identifiers
- Aliases: BHLHE40, BHLHB2, DEC1, HLHB2, SHARP-2, STRA13, Stra14, basic helix-loop-helix family member e40, Clast5, SHARP2
- External IDs: OMIM: 604256; MGI: 1097714; GeneCards: BHLHE40

Gene location (Human)
| Chr. | Chromosome 3 (human) |
| Band | 3p26.1 | Start | 4,979,437 bp |
| Band | 3p26.1 | End | 4,985,323 bp |

Gene location (Mouse)
| Chr. | Chromosome 6 (mouse) |
| Band | 6|6 E2 | Start | 108,637,590 bp |
| Band | 6|6 E2 | End | 108,643,886 bp |
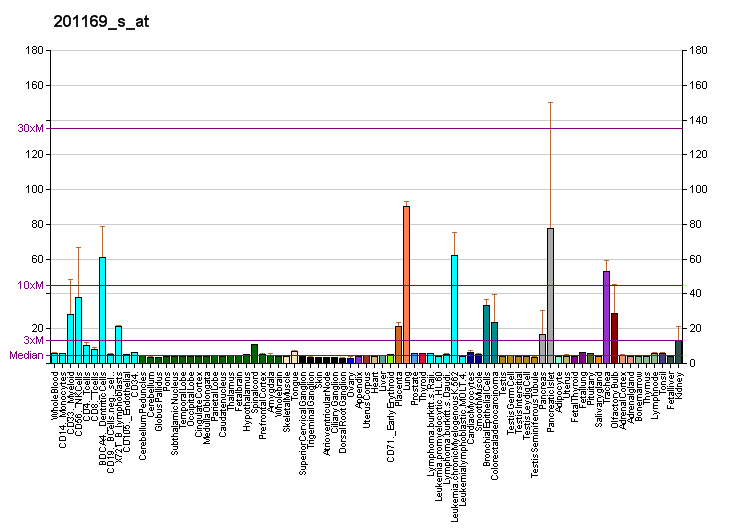

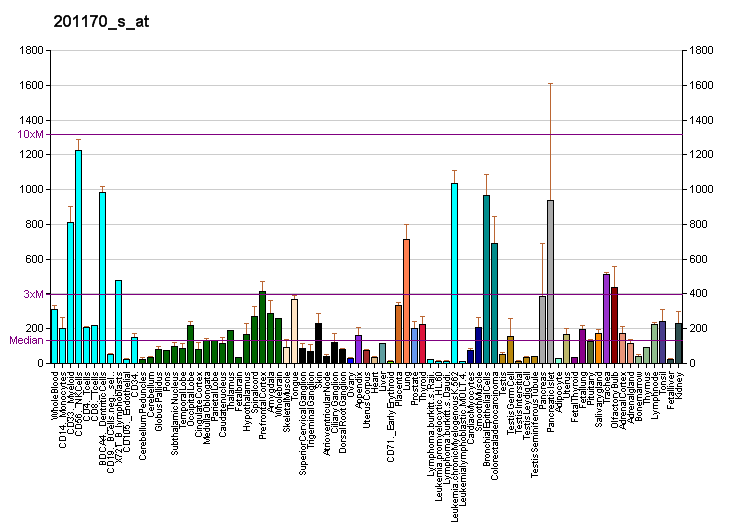
RNA expression pattern
| Bgee | Human / Mouse (ortholog); Top expressed in: saphenous vein; vena cava; beta cell; mucosa of pharynx; synovial joint; pericardium; tail of epididymis; gastric mucosa; mucosa of paranasal sinus; human penis / Top expressed in: ankle; decidua; plantaris muscle; extensor digitorum longus muscle; cervix; iris; left lobe of liver; tibialis anterior muscle; ciliary body; triceps brachii muscle; More reference expression data |
| BioGPS | More reference expression data |
Gene ontology
| Molecular function | DNA binding; protein dimerization activity; protein homodimerization activity; MRF binding; transcription corepressor activity; protein domain specific binding; DNA-binding transcription factor activity; DNA-binding transcription repressor activity, RNA polymerase II-specific; bHLH transcription factor binding; E-box binding; protein binding; protein heterodimerization activity; transcription factor activity, RNA polymerase II distal enhancer sequence-specific binding; DNA-binding transcription factor activity, RNA polymerase II-specific; RNA polymerase II transcription regulatory region sequence-specific DNA binding; RNA polymerase II cis-regulatory region sequence-specific DNA binding; transcription factor binding; sequence-specific DNA binding; sequence-specific double-stranded DNA binding |
| Cellular component | cytoplasm; nucleus; nuclear body |
| Biological process | regulation of transcription, DNA-templated; response to light stimulus; rhythmic process; negative regulation of transcription by RNA polymerase II; circadian regulation of gene expression; transcription, DNA-templated; negative regulation of DNA-binding transcription factor activity; negative regulation of transcription, DNA-templated; entrainment of circadian clock by photoperiod; circadian rhythm; somitogenesis; Notch signaling pathway; cell differentiation; regulation of neurogenesis |
Sources:Amigo / QuickGO
Orthologs
| Databases | NCBI: entry; OMA: entry |
| Species | Human | Mouse |
| Entrez | 8553 | 20893 |
| Ensembl | ENSG00000134107 | ENSMUSG00000030103 |
| UniProt | O14503 | O35185 |
| RefSeq (mRNA) | NM_003670 | NM_011498 |
| RefSeq (protein) | NP_003661 | NP_035628 |
| Location (UCSC) | Chr 3: 4.98 – 4.99 Mb | Chr 6: 108.64 – 108.64 Mb |
| PubMed search |
- Wikidata
| View/Edit Human | View/Edit Mouse |

Class E basic helix-loop-helix protein 40 is a protein that in humans is encoded by the BHLHE40 gene.

== Function ==
DEC1 encodes a basic helix–loop–helix protein expressed in various tissues. Expression in chondrocytes is responsive to the addition of Bt2cAMP. Differentiated embryo chondrocyte expressed gene 1 is believed to be involved in the control of cell differentiation.
