= Sleeping Girl (17th century painting) =

Painting by Domenico Fetti

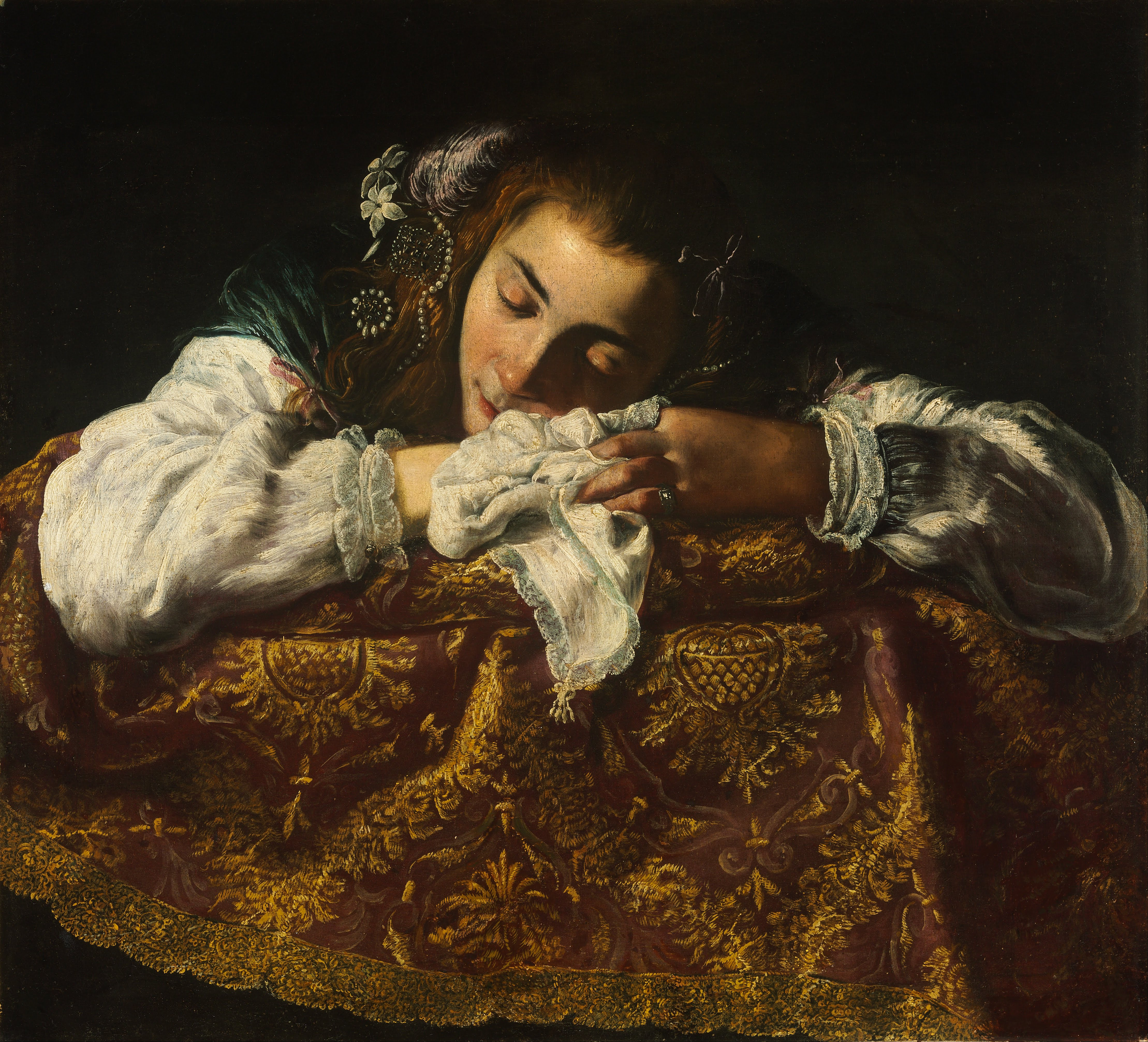

Sleeping Girl or Young Woman Sleeping is an oil on canvas painting by an unknown 17th century artist active in Rome, sometimes dated to c. 1620 and previously attributed to Theodoor van Loon or Domenico Fetti. It is now in the Museum of Fine Arts, which acquired it from the Esterházy family collection. Its catalogue number is 609.
