= Neuropeptide S receptor =

Protein-coding gene in the species Homo sapiens

NPSR1

Identifiers
- Aliases: NPSR1, ASRT2, GPR154, GPRA, NPSR, PGR14, VRR1, neuropeptide S receptor 1
- External IDs: OMIM: 608595; MGI: 2441738; GeneCards: NPSR1

Gene location (Human)
Chr.	Chromosome 7 (human)
Band	7p14.3	Start	34,658,218 bp
Band	7p14.3	End	34,878,332 bp

Gene location (Mouse)
Chr.	Chromosome 9 (mouse)
Band	9|9 A3- A4	Start	24,009,292 bp
Band	9|9 A3- A4	End	24,227,694 bp
RNA expression pattern
Bgee	Human / Mouse (ortholog); Top expressed in: testicle; gonad; ganglionic eminence; hypothalamus; prefrontal cortex; mucosa of transverse colon; anterior cingulate cortex; ventricular zone; Brodmann area 9; rectum / Top expressed in: dentate gyrus of hippocampal formation granule cell; cerebellar cortex; primary visual cortex; superior frontal gyrus; hypothalamus; neural layer of retina; hippocampus proper; thymus; lens; olfactory bulb; More reference expression data
BioGPS	n/a
Gene ontology
Molecular function	G protein-coupled receptor activity; vasopressin receptor activity; signal transducer activity; neuropeptide receptor activity
Cellular component	cytoplasm; integral component of membrane; plasma membrane; integral component of plasma membrane; membrane
Biological process	positive regulation of release of sequestered calcium ion into cytosol; neuropeptide signaling pathway; signal transduction; G protein-coupled receptor signaling pathway
Sources:Amigo / QuickGO
Orthologs
Databases	NCBI: entry; OMA: entry
Species	Human	Mouse
Entrez	387129	319239
Ensembl	ENSG00000187258	ENSMUSG00000043659
UniProt	Q6W5P4	Q8BZP8
RefSeq (mRNA)	NM_207173; NM_001300933; NM_001300934; NM_001300935; NM_207172	NM_175678
RefSeq (protein)	NP_001287862; NP_001287863; NP_001287864; NP_997055; NP_997056	NP_783609
Location (UCSC)	Chr 7: 34.66 – 34.88 Mb	Chr 9: 24.01 – 24.23 Mb
PubMed search
- Wikidata
View/Edit Human	View/Edit Mouse

The neuropeptide S receptor (NPSR) is a member of the G-protein coupled receptor superfamily of integral membrane proteins which binds neuropeptide S (NPS). It was formerly an orphan receptor, GPR154, until the discovery of neuropeptide S as the endogenous ligand. Increased expression of this gene in ciliated cells of the respiratory epithelium and in bronchial smooth muscle cells is associated with asthma. This gene is a member of the G protein-coupled receptor 1 family and encodes a plasma membrane protein. Mutations in this gene have also been associated with this disease.

== Clinical significance ==
In the CNS, activation of the NPSR by NPS promotes arousal and anxiolytic-like effects.

In addition, mututations in NPSR have been linked to a susceptibility to asthma (rs3249801, N107I). Hence NPSR has also been called GPRA (G protein-coupled receptor for asthma susceptibility). Activation of NPSR in the airway epithelium has a number of effects including upregulation of matrix metalloproteinases which are involved in the pathogenesis of asthma. It has been shown that activation of NPSR by NPS affects both gastrointestinal motility and mucosal permeability simultaneously. Aberrant signaling and upregulation of NPSR1 could potentially exacerbate dysmotility and hyperpermeability by local mechanisms in gastrointestinal functional and inflammatory reactions.

The very rare NPSR mutation Y206H, which makes the receptor more sensitive to NPS, may cause familial natural short sleep. This finding has not been investigated in animal models, and is sufficiently rare that a biobank study was unable to find other carriers to attempt a replication of the association with sleep duration.
