= Michel Jouvet =

French neuroscientist (1925–2017)

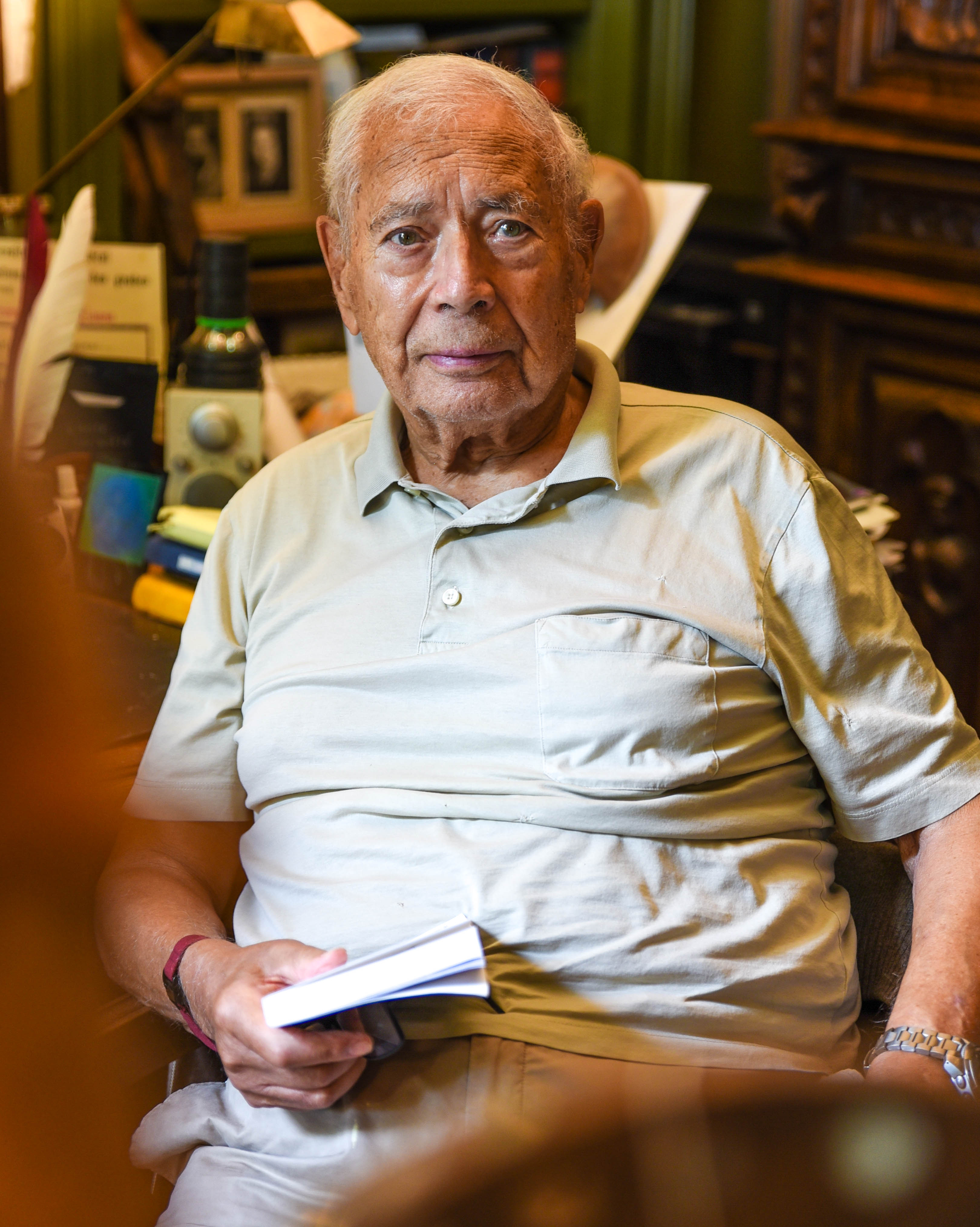
- Born: Michel Valentin Marcel Jouvet; 16 November 1925; Lons-le-Saunier, Jura, France
- Died: 3 October 2017 (aged 91); Villeurbanne, France
- Occupations: Neuroscientist, medical researcher
- Years active: 1950s–2017
- Known for: sleep research

Academic background
- Education: University of Lyon; University of Paris (Medicine)

Academic work
- Institutions: University of Lyon

Michel Valentin Marcel Jouvet (French: [miʃɛl ʒuvɛ]; 16 November 1925 – 3 October 2017) was a French neuroscientist and medical researcher.

His works, and those of his team, have brought about the discovery of paradoxical sleep (a term he coined) and its individualisation as the third state of functioning of the brain (1959), to the discovery of its phylogenesis, of its ontogenesis and its main mechanisms. Jouvet was the researcher who first developed the eugeroic drug Modafinil.

== Career ==
Jouvet was Professor of Experimental Medicine at the University of Lyon. He was Director of the Research Unit INSERM U 52 (Molecular Onirology) and of the Associated Unit UA 1195 of the CNRS (states of vigilance neurobiology). He spent one year in the laboratory of Horace Magoun in Long Beach, California in 1955. He then undertook research in both experimental neurophysiology at the Faculty of Medicine of Lyon and clinical neurophysiology at the Neurological Hospital of Lyon.

He described the electroencephalogram signs of cerebral death in 1959. In 1961 Jouvet categorized sleep into two different states: telencephalic (slow wave) sleep and rhombencephalic sleep (paradoxical sleep, known as REM sleep in English-language writings on the subject). He mapped the areas of the brain that are responsible for REM.

His review "Paradoxical sleep mechanisms" was published in the journal Sleep in 1994. In The Paradox of Sleep (MIT Press, 1999) Jouvet proposed the speculative theory that the purpose of dreaming is a kind of iterative neurological programming that works to preserve an individual's psychological heredity, the basis of personality. He also wrote a novel, The Castle of Dreams.

In 1959, Jouvet conducted several experiments on cats regarding muscle atonia (paralysis) during REM sleep. Jouvet demonstrated that the generation of REM sleep depends on an intact pontine tegmentum and that REM atonia is due to an inhibition of motor centres in the medulla oblongata. Cats with lesions around the locus coeruleus have less restricted muscle movement during REM sleep, and show a variety of complex behaviours including motor patterns suggesting that they are dreaming of attack, defence and exploration. Jouvet's research led to the identification of REM sleep behavior disorder.

== Honors and awards ==
He was elected in 1977 to the French Academy of Sciences and received the Intra-Sciences Prize in the United States in 1981 and the Prize of the Foundation for the Medical Research in 1983. In 1991 he was awarded the prestigious Prix mondial Cino Del Duca.

The Sleep Research Society presented him with its Distinguished Scientist Award in 1990. In June 2003, Jouvet was recognized at the 17th annual meeting of the Associated Professional Sleep Societies (APSS).

== Death ==
Jouvet died on 3 October 2017, at the age of 91.

== See also ==
- Eugene Aserinsky
- William C. Dement
- Nathaniel Kleitman
