= Sleep onset latency =

Quantitative measure of the tendency to fall asleep

MSLT Scores
Minutes	Sleepiness
0–5	Severe
5–10	Troublesome
10–15	Manageable
15–20	Excellent
A sleep onset latency of 0 to 5 minutes means severe sleep deprivation, 5 to 10 minutes is "troublesome", 10 to 15 minutes indicates a mild but "manageable" degree of sleep debt, and 15 to 20 minutes is indicative of "little or no" sleep debt.

In sleep science, sleep onset latency (SOL) is the length of time that it takes to accomplish the transition from full wakefulness to sleep, normally to the lightest of the non-REM sleep stages.

== Sleep latency studies ==
Pioneering Stanford University sleep researcher William C. Dement reports the early development of the concept, and of the first test for it, the Multiple Sleep Latency Test (MSLT), in his book The Promise of Sleep. Dement and colleagues including Mary Carskadon had been seeking an objective measure of daytime sleepiness to help assess the effects of sleep disorders. In the course of evaluating experimental results, they realized that the amount of time it took to fall asleep in bed was closely linked to the subjects' own self-evaluated level of sleepiness. "This may not seem like an earthshaking epiphany, but conceiving and developing an objective measure of sleepiness was perhaps one of the most important advances in sleep science," Dement and coauthor Christopher Vaughn write of the discovery.

When they initially developed the MSLT, Dement and others put subjects in a quiet, dark room with a bed and asked them to lie down, close their eyes and relax. They noted the number of minutes, ranging from 0 to 20, that it took a subject to fall asleep. If a volunteer was still awake after 20 minutes, the experiment was ended and the subject given a maximal alertness/minimal sleepiness rating. When scientists deprived subjects of sleep, they found sleep latency levels could drop below 1, i.e., subjects could fall asleep in less than a minute. The amount of sleep loss was directly linked to changes in sleep latency scores.

The studies eventually led Dement and Carskadon to conclude that "the brain keeps an exact accounting of how much sleep it is owed". Not getting enough sleep during any given period of time leads to a phenomenon called sleep debt, which lowers sleep latency scores and makes sleep-deprived individuals fall asleep more quickly.

== Home testing of sleep latency ==
For home-testing for an unusually low sleep latency and potential sleep deprivation, the authors point to a technique developed by Nathaniel Kleitman, the "father of sleep research". The subject reclines in a quiet, darkened room and drapes a hand holding a spoon over the edge of the bed or chair, placing a plate on the floor beneath the spoon. After checking the time, the subject tries to relax and fall asleep. When sleep is attained, the spoon will fall and strike the plate, awakening the subject, who then checks to see how much time has passed. The number of minutes passed is the sleep onset latency at that particular hour on that particular day.

Dement advises against doing these evaluations at night when sleep onset latency can naturally be lower, particularly in older people. Instead, he suggests testing sleep onset latency during the day, ideally at 10:00 a.m., 12:30 p.m. and 3:00 p.m. A sleep onset latency of 0 to 5 minutes indicates severe sleep deprivation, 5 to 10 minutes is "troublesome", 10 to 15 minutes indicates a mild but "manageable" degree of sleep debt, and 15 to 20 minutes is indicative of "little or no" sleep debt

== Biomarkers of sleepiness ==
Contemporary sleep researchers, including Paul Shaw of Washington University School of Medicine in St. Louis, have been pursuing the development of biological indicators, or biomarkers, of sleepiness. In December 2006, Shaw reported online in The Proceedings of the National Academy of Sciences that his lab had shown that levels of amylase increased in fruit fly saliva when the flies were sleep-deprived. He then showed that human amylase also increased as human subjects were deprived of sleep.

== See also ==
- Sleep onset
