= Mary Carskadon =

American sleep researcher (born 1947)

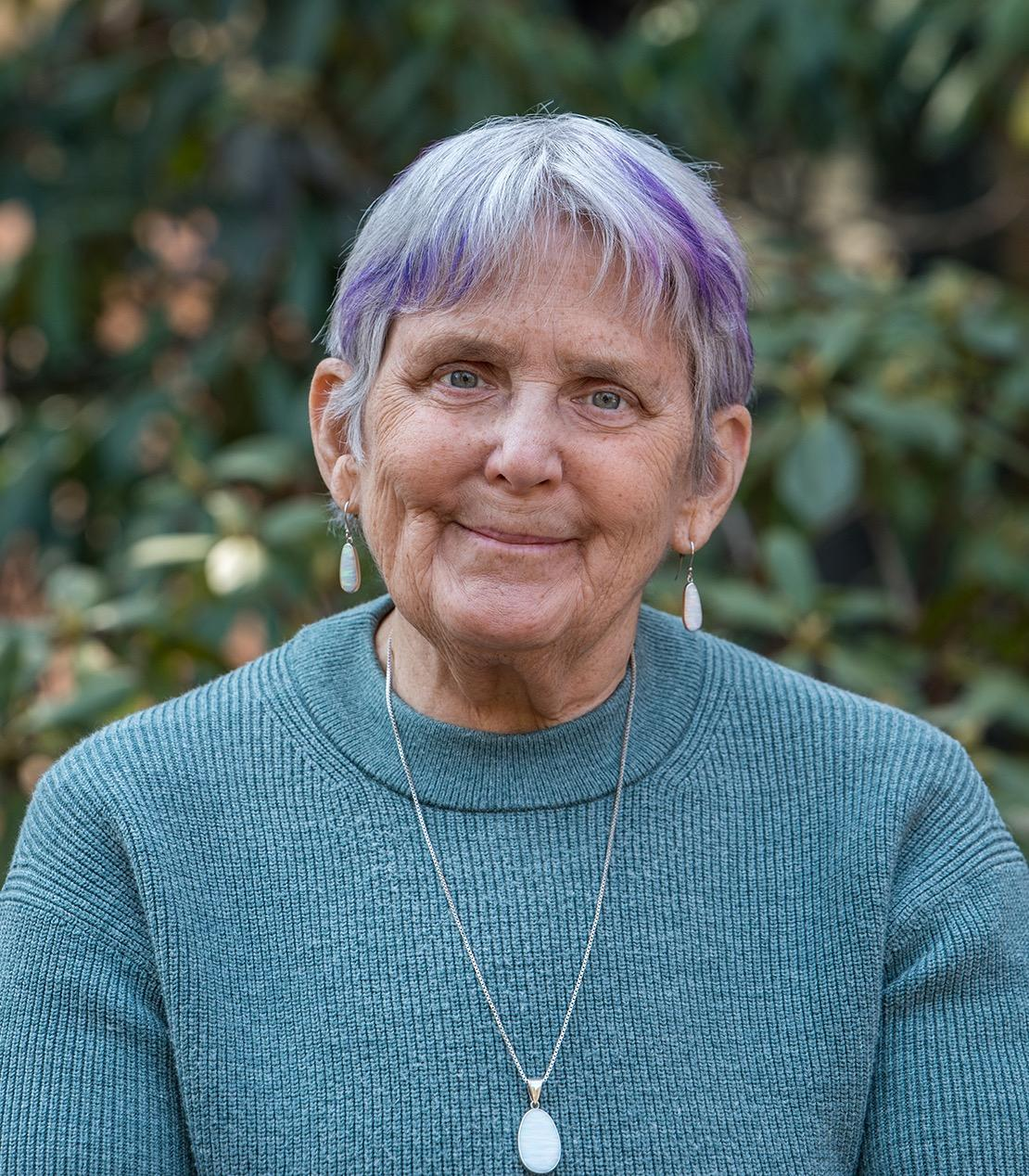
- Carskadon in 2023
- Born: July 1947 (age 79); Illinois
- Citizenship: United States
- Education: B.S., Gettysburg College (1969) Ph.D., Stanford University (1979)
- Known for: The Multiple Sleep Latency Test
- Scientific career
- Fields: Sleep research
- Workplaces: Brown University
- Thesis: Determinants of Daytime Sleepiness: Adolescent Development, Extended and Restricted Nocturnal Sleep (1979)
- Doctoral advisor: William C. Dement
- Website: vivo.brown.edu/display/mcarskad

Mary A. Carskadon is an American sleep researcher who is a professor in the Department of Psychiatry and Human Behavior at the Warren Alpert Medical School of Brown University. Carskadon is the director of both the Bradley Hospital Sleep Research Laboratory and also the COBRE Center for Sleep and Circadian Rhythms in Child and Adolescent Mental Health.

A prominent expert on sleep and circadian rhythms during childhood, adolescence, and young adulthood, Carskadon researches issues related to daytime sleepiness. She has also contributed important research on school start times as it relates to sleep patterns and sleepiness in adolescence.

== Early life and education ==
Mary Alice Carskadon, born in Illinois in July 1947, is the daughter of Gretchen (née Shumaker) and Edward Bell Carskadon. During her childhood in Elizabethtown, Pennsylvania, she was active in the local Brownie troop, and played tennis and field hockey.

Carskadon studied psychology at Gettysburg College, graduating as a distinguished alumna in 1969, and the college bestowed an honorary doctor of sciences degree on her in 1999. She earned a doctorate with distinction in neuro- and biobehavioral sciences at Stanford University in 1979, with a dissertation titled, Determinants of Daytime Sleepiness: Adolescent Development, Extended and Restricted Nocturnal Sleep, advised by William C. Dement.

== Career ==
Along with Dement, Carskadon developed the Multiple Sleep Latency Test (MSLT) used to clinically determine sleepiness in sleep disordered patients, particularly by measuring daytime sleep onset latency. Carskadon started her own research group at Brown University in 1985. In addition to researching sleep and circadian rhythms during childhood, adolescence, and young adulthood, Carskadon has studied issues related to daytime sleepiness.

"I'm just a smalltown kid who worked hard, kept her head down, and got lucky," she protested a few years ago...

In the realm of sleep science, however, Carskadon is true royalty—a direct heir to the legacy of Nathaniel Kleitman, the field's founding ancestor. She has won just about every award the field has to offer, including one named after the founder himself. (An award has been named after Carskadon, as well.) Her research, which began when women scientists were a rarity, has helped shape the discipline over the past half-century. And her discoveries have changed millions of lives.

— Kenneth Miller

Carskadon has also contributed important research on school start times as it relates to sleep patterns and sleepiness in adolescence. Her research in adolescent sleep/wake behavior has resulted in proposed changes in public policy. This research suggests that circadian rhythms shift during adolescence and that secondary schools should have later start times.

Carskadon offers a summer internship at the Bradley Sleep Lab for undergraduate college students interested in sleep research. These students, known as Dement Fellows, after William C. Dement, work in the sleep lab for the entirety of the summer and learn under Carskadon. Carskadon's lab also hosts adolescents who live in the sleep lab for 14 days during the summer. The adolescents participate in summer camp-like activities while their sleep is monitored each night.

Carskadon is a past president of the Sleep Research Society (1999–2000) and founder of the Northeast Sleep Society (1986).

== Awards and honors ==
- Nathaniel Kleitman Distinguished Service Award of the American Sleep Disorders Association (1991)
- Lifetime Achievement Award of the National Sleep Foundation (2003)
- Mark O. Hatfield Public Policy Award of the American Academy of Sleep Medicine (2003)
- Outstanding Educator Award of the Sleep Research Society (2005). (The Sleep Research Society has since renamed the award the Mary A. Carskadon Outstanding Educator Award.)
- Distinguished Scientist Award by the Sleep Research Society (2007).
- Carskadon was recognized and awarded by Harvard Medical School Division of Sleep Medicine Prize, for her outstanding lifetime contribution to the field of sleep (2020).
- The Association of Polysomnographic Technologists annually presents the Carskadon Award for Research Excellence to a member, "for excellence and originality of an abstract in basic or clinical sleep research."
- Brown University Distinguished Research Achievement Award (2023).
- William C. Dement Academic Achievement Award (2023), for "exceptional initiative and progress in the areas of academic research…pursuit of knowledge, a commitment to teaching, and an unceasing quest to disseminate truth, American Academy of Sleep Medicine."
- The V. Sagar Sethi, M.D., Mental Health Research Award (2023), "for significant contributions to basic research in the neurosciences, psychology, or pharmacology at a molecular, cellular or behavioral level."
- Leadership in Sleep Medicine Award from the American Association of Physicians of Indian Origin – Sleep (2024)

== Selected publications ==
=== Books ===
- Carskadon, Mary A., ed. (1995). Encyclopedia of sleep and dreaming. New York: Macmillan. ISBN 978-0-02-897085-1.
- Carskadon, Mary; Sateia, Michael; Lee-Chion, Teofilo, eds. (February 14, 2002). Sleep Medicine. Hanley & Belfus. ISBN 978-1560534303.
- Carskadon, Mary, ed. (August 19, 2002). Adolescent Sleep Patterns: Biological, Social, and Psychological Influences. Cambridge University Press. ISBN 978-0521642910.
- Carskadon, Mary A., ed. (February 1, 2005). Pediatric and Adolescent Sleep: A Special Issue of Behavioral Sleep Medicine. Psychology Press. ISBN 978-0805894936.
- Carskadon, Mary A.; Rechtschaffen, Allan (March 8, 2005). "Monitoring and staging human sleep" (PDF). In Kryger, Meir H.; Roth, T.; Dement, William C. (eds.). Principles and practice of sleep medicine (4th ed.). Philadelphia, PA: Elsevier/Saunders. ISBN 978-0-7216-0797-9.
- Carskadon, Mary; Jenni, Oskar G., eds. (October 26, 2007). Child and Adolescent Sleep, An Issue of Sleep Medicine Clinics (Volume 2-3). Saunders. ISBN 978-1416051244.
- Carskadon, Mary, ed. (March 1, 2011). 100 Q and A's About Shift Work Sleep Disorder. Jones & Bartlett Learning. ISBN 978-0763791070.
- Carskadon, Mary A.; Dement, William C. (2011). "Normal Human Sleep : An Overview" (PDF). Principles and Practice of Sleep Medicine (5th ed.). St. Louis: Elsevier. pp. 16–26. doi:10.1016/c2009-0-59875-3. ISBN 978-1-4160-6645-3.

=== Articles ===
- Carskadon, Mary A. (1986-12-01). "Guidelines for the Multiple Sleep Latency Test (MSLT): A Standard Measure of Sleepiness". Sleep. 9 (4): 519–524. doi:10.1093/sleep/9.4.519. ISSN 0161-8105. PMID 3809866.
- Carskadon, Mary A. (1990). "Patterns of Sleep and Sleepiness in Adolescents". Pediatrician. 17 (1): 5–12. PMID 2315238.
- Sadeh, Avi; Sharkey, M.; Carskadon, Mary A. (1994-05-01). "Activity-Based Sleep-Wake Identification: An Empirical Test of Methodological Issues". Sleep. 17 (3): 201–207. doi:10.1093/sleep/17.3.201. ISSN 0161-8105. PMID 7939118.
- Carskadon, Mary A.; Vieira, Cecilia; Acebo, Christine (1995). "Association between Puberty and Delayed Phase Preference". Sleep. 16 (3): 258–262. doi:10.1093/sleep/16.3.258. ISSN 1550-9109. PMID 8506460.
- Carskadon, Mary A.; Wolfson, Amy R.; Acebo, Christine; Tzischinsky, Orna; Seifer, Ronald (1998-12-01). "Adolescent Sleep Patterns, Circadian Timing, and Sleepiness at a Transition to Early School Days". Sleep. 21 (8): 871–881. doi:10.1093/sleep/21.8.871. ISSN 0161-8105. PMID 9871949.
- Carskadon, Mary A.; Acebo, Christine; Jenni, Oskar G. (2004). "Regulation of Adolescent Sleep: Implications for Behavior". Annals of the New York Academy of Sciences. 1021 (1): 276–291. Bibcode:2004NYASA1021..276C. doi:10.1196/annals.1308.032. ISSN 1749-6632. PMID 15251897.
- Carskadon, Mary A.; Acebo, Christine; Jenni, Oskar G. (2006). "Regulation of Adolescent Sleep: Implications for Behavior". Annals of the New York Academy of Sciences. 1021 (1): 276–291. doi:10.1196/annals.1308.032. ISSN 0077-8923. PMID 15251897.
- Crowley, Stephanie J.; Acebo, Christine; Carskadon, Mary A. (2007). "Sleep, circadian rhythms, and delayed phase in adolescence". Sleep Medicine. 8 (6): 602–612. doi:10.1016/j.sleep.2006.12.002. PMID 17383934.
- Wolfson, Amy R.; Carskadon, Mary A. (2008). "Sleep Schedules and Daytime Functioning in Adolescents". Child Development. 69 (4): 875–887. doi:10.1111/j.1467-8624.1998.tb06149.x. ISSN 0009-3920. PMID 9768476.
- Carskadon, Mary A. (June 2011). "Sleep in Adolescents: The Perfect Storm". Pediatric Clinics of North America. 58 (3): 637–647. doi:10.1016/j.pcl.2011.03.003. ISSN 0031-3955. PMC 3130594. PMID 21600346. Archived from the original on April 19, 2013.
- Owens, Judith; Au, Rhoda; Carskadon, Mary; Millman, Richard; Wolfson, Amy; Braverman, Paula K.; Adelman, William P.; Breuner, Cora C.; Levine, David A.; Marcell, Arik V.; Murray, Pamela J.; O’Brien, Rebecca F. (2014-09-01). "Insufficient Sleep in Adolescents and Young Adults: An Update on Causes and Consequences". Pediatrics. 134 (3): e921–e932. doi:10.1542/peds.2014-1696. ISSN 0031-4005. PMC 8194472. PMID 25157012.
- Dautovich, Natalie D.; Gunn, Heather E.; Dzierzewski, Joseph M.; Hale, Lauren; Hasler, Brant; Saletin, Jared M.; Troxel, Wendy M.; Wong, Imelda S.; Brown, Zackary; Carskadon, Mary A.; Owens, Judith; Pelayo, Rafael; Wahlstrom, Kyla L.; Gozal, David (2026-02-21). "Adolescent sleep health: Recommendations from the National Sleep Foundation". Sleep Health: Journal of the National Sleep Foundation. 0 (0). doi:10.1016/j.sleh.2026.01.002. ISSN 2352-7218. PMID 41724650.
- Barker, David H.; Carskadon, Mary A.; Gredvig-Ardito, Caroline; Hart, Chantelle N.; Raynor, Hollie A.; Scheer, Frank A. J. L. (2025-02-25). "Independent effects of the human circadian system and sleep/eating cycles on caloric intake in adolescents vary by weight status". Proceedings of the National Academy of Sciences. 122 (8). doi:10.1073/pnas.2407907122. ISSN 0027-8424. PMC 11874483. PMID 39964717.
- Carskadon, Mary A (2025-01-13). "So Long, SLEEP Advances …". Sleep Advances. 6 (1). doi:10.1093/sleepadvances/zpaf006. ISSN 2632-5012. PMC 11792890. PMID 39906876.
