= Multiple Sleep Latency Test =

- ICD-9-CM: 89.18
- OPS-301 code: 1-795

The Multiple Sleep Latency Test (MSLT) is a sleep disorder diagnostic tool. It is used to measure the time elapsed from the start of a daytime nap period to the first signs of sleep, called sleep latency. The test is based on the idea that the sleepier people are, the faster they will fall asleep.

The MSLT is used to test for central disorders of hypersomnolence such as narcolepsy or idiopathic hypersomnia, or to distinguish between physical tiredness and true excessive daytime sleepiness. Its main purpose is to discover how readily a person will fall asleep in a conducive setting, how consistent or variable this is, and whether there are abnormalities in the rapidity of REM sleep onset. This can be used to identify and differentiate between various sleep problems.

The test consists of four or five 20-minute nap opportunities set two hours apart, often following an overnight sleep study. During the test, data such as the patient's brain waves, EEG, muscle activity, and eye movements are monitored and recorded. The entire test normally takes about 7 hours during the course of a day.

== History ==
The Multiple Sleep Latency Test was created in 1977 by sleep pioneers William C. Dement and Mary Carskadon. It developed out of repeating a project done in 1970 by Dr. Dement called the 90-minute day. They informally called the 0–5 minute range the twilight zone due to its indication of extreme physical and mental impairment. As an objective measure of daytime sleepiness, the MSLT quickly found additional applications in sleep research, quantifying changes in daytime wakefulness following hypnotic drugs, shifted sleep schedules, and jet lag.

== Typical procedure ==
Preparation: On the day of the test the patient is asked not to consume any stimulants, such as tea, coffee, colas, and chocolate.

- Often a formal sleep study has been performed the night before.
- Sometimes urine screening is done to make sure no substances exist in the subject's body that might interfere with sleep.
- The patient may be asked to fill out a pre-test questionnaire.
- Electrodes are attached to the patient's head to record brain waves.
- Electrodes are attached near the eyes to record eye movement.
- Electrodes are attached to the chin to detect muscle tone.
- Heart beat may also be monitored.
- These sensors are connected to a computer. The sensors show when patient is asleep and awake, and transmit data used to determine when patient is in REM sleep. The nap trial begins when the lights are turned off.
- The patient is asked to perform simple tasks to test that the equipment is working properly.
- The patient is asked to nap for 20 minutes, and then is awakened.
- The nap process is repeated every 2 hours for a total of four or five times.
- The patient must remain awake for the entirety of the 2 hours between nap opportunities.
- The patient may be asked to fill out a post-test questionnaire.

== Interpretation ==
MSLT Scores
Minutes	Sleepiness
0–5	Severe
5–10	Troublesome
10–15	Manageable
15–20	Excellent

A clinical neurophysiologist, neurologist, psychiatrist or sleep specialist will review the results and inform the patient or the patient's primary care physician of the interpretation of the test result in the context of the clinical problem.

The sleep latency (time between the start of the nap opportunity and sleep onset determined by EEG) is determined for each of the four or five nap opportunities. If no sleep occurred during a nap opportunity, the sleep latency is recorded as 20 minutes for that nap opportunity. The average of sleep latency from the four or five naps is taken as the overall sleep latency for the entire test. In general, a sleep latency of less than 8 minutes is considered objective evidence of excessive sleepiness. Additionally, any nap opportunity during which REM sleep onset was noted within 15 minutes is marked as a "sleep-onset REM period (SOREMP)." In the appropriate context, more than 1 SOREMP between the preceding PSG and the MSLT may support a diagnosis of narcolepsy. Results must be interpreted cautiously as comorbid sleep disorders, medications, or recreational drug use can affect REM sleep onset.
