= Reverse learning =

Neurobiological theory of dreams

Reverse learning is a neurobiological theory of dreams. In 1983, in a paper published in the science journal Nature, Crick and Mitchison's reverse learning model likened the process of dreaming to a computer in that it was "off-line" during dreaming or the REM phase of sleep. During this phase, the brain sifts through information gathered throughout the day and throws out all unwanted material. According to the model, we dream in order to forget and this involves a process of 'reverse learning' or 'unlearning'.

The cortex cannot cope with the vast amount of information received throughout the day without developing "parasitic" thoughts that would disrupt the efficient organisation of memory. During REM sleep, these unwanted connections in cortical networks are wiped out or damped down by the Crick-Mitchison process making use of impulses bombarding the cortex from sub-cortical areas.

The Crick-Mitchison theory is a variant upon Hobson and McCarley's activation-synthesis hypothesis, published in December 1977. Hobson and McCarley hypothesized that a brain stem neuronal mechanism sends pontine-geniculo-occipital (or PGO) waves that automatically activate the mammalian forebrain. By comparing information generated in specific brain areas with information stored in memory, the forebrain synthesizes dreams during REM sleep.

== Crick verbatim on the function of REM sleep ==
Suppose one did not have REM, then one would mix things up. That is not necessarily a bad thing — it is the basis of fantasy, imagination, and so forth. Imagination means seeing a connection between two things that are different but which have something in common which you had not noticed before. If one had too much REM, one would predict one would be a rather prosaic person without too much imagination. But the process is not 100% efficient. If one goes on too far, one begins to wipe out everything.

Another way to look at it is to say "How could you prevent the brain being overloaded"? One way would be to make it bigger, to have more neurons. So perhaps the important thing to say is "The function of REM is to allow your brain or your cortex to be smaller".

== Support for the theory of reverse learning ==
In the echidna, a primitive egg-laying mammal that has no REM sleep, there is a very enlarged frontal cortex. Crick and Mitchison argue that this excessive cortical development is necessary to store both adaptive memories and parasitic memories, which in more highly evolved animals are disposed of during REM sleep.

This theory solves the brain information storage problem, as our cortex would need to be much larger due to the inefficient storage of information. It also explains why we forget dreams extremely easily.

== Objections to the theory of reverse learning ==
One problem for reverse-learning theory is that dreams are often organized into clear narratives (stories). It is unclear why dreams would be organized in a systematic way if they consisted only of disposable parasitic thoughts. It is also unclear why babies sleep so much, because it seems they would have less to forget.

In response to these objections, Crick and Mitchison proposed that the principal target for the unlearning process could be obsessive memories (strong attractors) and that the dream/REM purpose is to equalize the strength of memories.

A computational model by Kinouchi and Kinouchi (2002) implementing a chaotic itinerancy dynamics in a Hopfield net shows that the Crick-Mitchison unlearning mechanism produces a trajectory of associated attractors ("a narrative") where the strong ("emotional", "obsessive" or "overplastic") memories have their dominance downplayed and an equalization between memory basins produces a better recovery of memories not recalled during the "dream".

It is argued that fetuses and babies sleep so much to downgrade ("unlearn") the force of synapses present in these developmental phases.

== See also ==
Francis Crick: Neuroscience and other interests
