= David M. Maurice =

British ophthalmologist (1922–2002)

David Myer Maurice (3 April 1922 in London – 20 July 2002 in Manhattan) was a British ophthalmologist, noted for his contributions to the development of the specular microscope used for examination of the cornea.

== Biography ==
Maurice was educated at Highgate School from 1934 until 1939. He received in 1941 B.Sc. General and in 1942 B.Sc. Special (Physics) from the University of Reading. After WW II military service from 1942 to 1946 working on radar evasion, he received in 1951 his Ph.D. in physiology from University College London. From 1950 to 1968 he did research in ophthalmology at the Institute of Ophthalmology, University of London. From 1968 to 1993 he was a senior scientist and then professor of ophthalmology at Stanford University Medical School. From 1993 to 1996 he was a professor of ocular physiology in the Department of Ophthalmology in the College of Physicians and Surgeons, Columbia University. From 1996 to 2002 he was an adjunct professor of ocular physiology in the Department of Ophthalmology, Columbia University. For the academic year 1951–1952 he was a British Council Scholar at the University of Rome. For the academic year 1957–1958 he was a Fulbright Fellow at the University of California, San Francisco. For the academic year 1979–1980 he was a Guggenheim Fellow at the University of Paris.

His PhD thesis on corneal permeability introduced the pump-leak hypothesis for the corneal endothelium. At the Institute of Ophthalmology in London, he worked on the explanation of the physical basis of corneal transparency, aqueous humor dynamics, and other topics in the physiology of the eye. He introduced fluorescein for the investigation of aqueous humor flow, now an important technique in ocular research.

In 1968 he moved to the United States but retained his British citizenship. He settled at Stanford University where he became a research professor of ophthalmology. He continued to develop a specular microscope, which subsequently has become a widely used, routine tool for evaluating the corneal endothelium in health and disease. It has also become valuable for screening donor corneas for transplantation. Together with a long list of fellows he developed highly original methods for impression cytology of the conjunctiva, penetration of drugs into the eye, and measurements of toxic side effects to the eye. He even entered such domains as eye movements, myopia, and retinal detachment.

He was a founding member of the journal Experimental Eye Research (first issue published in 1961) and a member of its editorial board until 2001. In 1998 he published a theory of REM-sleep oxygen supply to the cornea.

Upon his death he was survived by his wife, his ex-wife, three daughters, and five grandchildren.

== Honours and awards ==
- 1967 — Friedenwald Memorial Award from the Association for Research in Ophthalmology
- 1981 — George Smelser Memorial Lecturer at Columbia University, New York
- 1984 — Ida Mann Lecturer at Oxford University, England
- 1985 — Claes Dohlman Lecturer at the Massachusetts Eye and Ear Infirmary
- 1985 — Lacrima Award from the Dry Eye Society
- 1986 — Castroviejo Lecturer at the Castroviejo Society
- 1988–1992 — President of the International Society of Ocular Fluorophotometry
- 1989 — Charles F. Prentice Memorial Medal from the American Academy of Optometry
- 1992 — W. Williamson Memorial Lecturer at the University of Manchester, England
- 1996 — Von Sallmann Prize in Vision and Ophthalmology
- 2001 — Diaz Caneja Award from the University of Valladolid, Spain
- 2003 — Helen Keller Prize for Vision Research (posthumous award)
