= Randy Gardner sleep deprivation experiment =

American sleeplessness world record holder

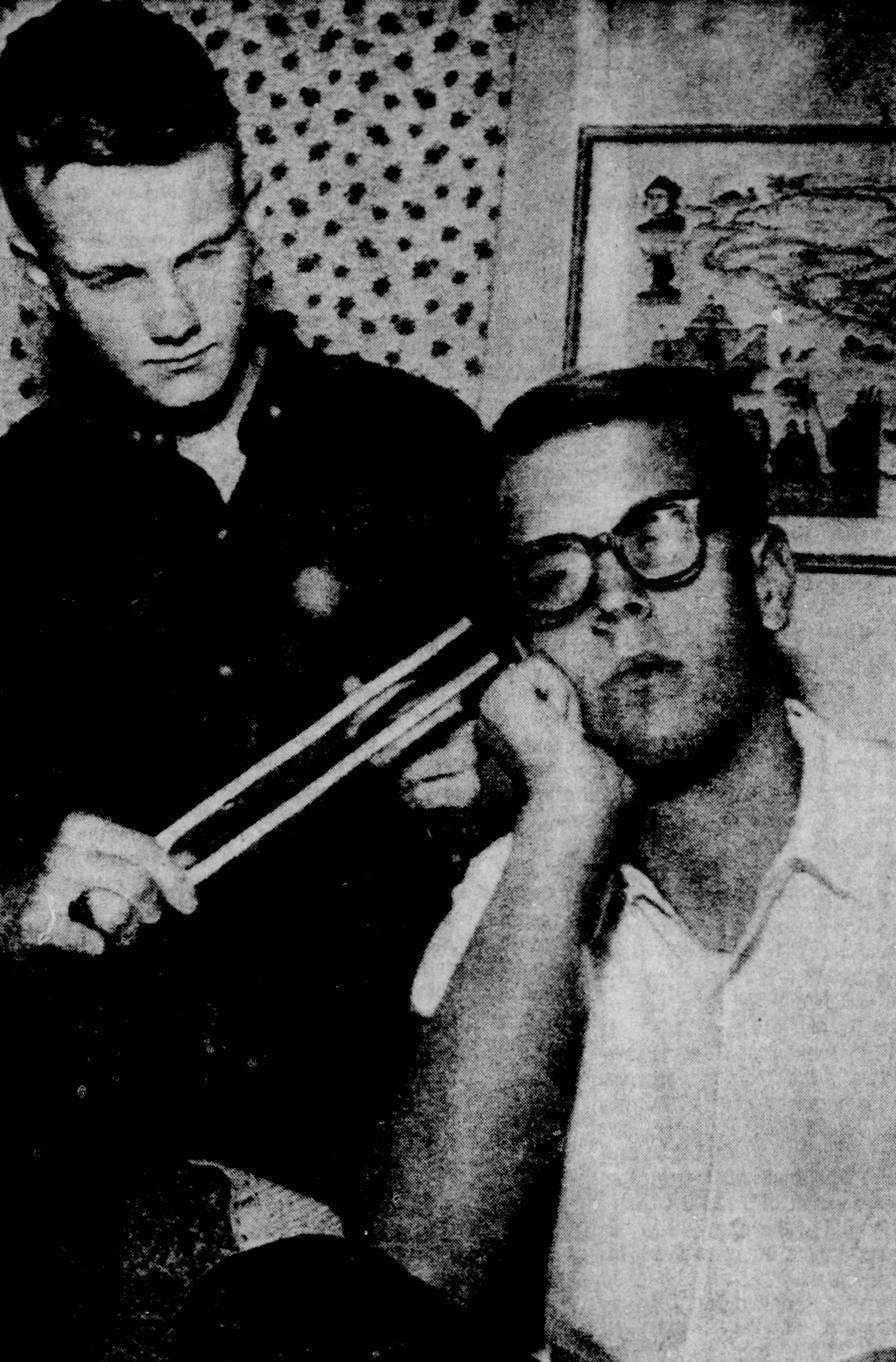
A friend of Gardner tests his reaction to a tuning fork during the experiment

Randy Gardner (born 1946) is an American man from San Diego, California, who once held the record for the longest amount of time a human has gone without sleep. Between December 1963 and January 1964, the then 17-year-old Gardner stayed awake for 11 days and 25 minutes (264.4 hours), breaking the previous record of 260 hours held by Tom Rounds. Gardner's record was then broken repeatedly until 1997, when Guinness World Records ceased accepting new attempts for safety reasons. At that point, the record was held by Robert McDonald at 18 days and 21 hours (453 hours and 40 minutes).

Gardner's record attempt was attended by Stanford sleep researcher Dr. William C. Dement, while his health was monitored by Lt. Cmdr. John J. Ross. A log was kept by two of Gardner's classmates from Point Loma High School, Bruce McAllister and Joe Marciano Jr. Accounts of Gardner's sleep deprivation experience and medical response became widely known among the sleep research community.

== Health effects ==
It has been claimed that Gardner's experiment demonstrated that extreme sleep deprivation has little effect, other than the mood changes associated with tiredness, primarily due to a report by researcher William C. Dement, who stated that on the tenth day of the experiment, Gardner had been, among other things, able to beat Dement at pinball. However, contrary to this, Lieutenant Commander John J. Ross, who monitored his health, reported serious cognitive and behavioral changes. These included moodiness, problems with concentration and short-term memory, paranoia, and hallucinations. On the eleventh day, when he was asked to subtract seven repeatedly, starting with 100, he stopped at 65. When asked why he had stopped, he replied that he had forgotten what he was doing.

On his final day, Gardner presided over a press conference where he appeared to be in good health. "I wanted to prove that bad things didn't happen if you went without sleep," said Gardner. "I thought, 'I can break that record and I don't think it would be a negative experience.'"

== Recovery ==
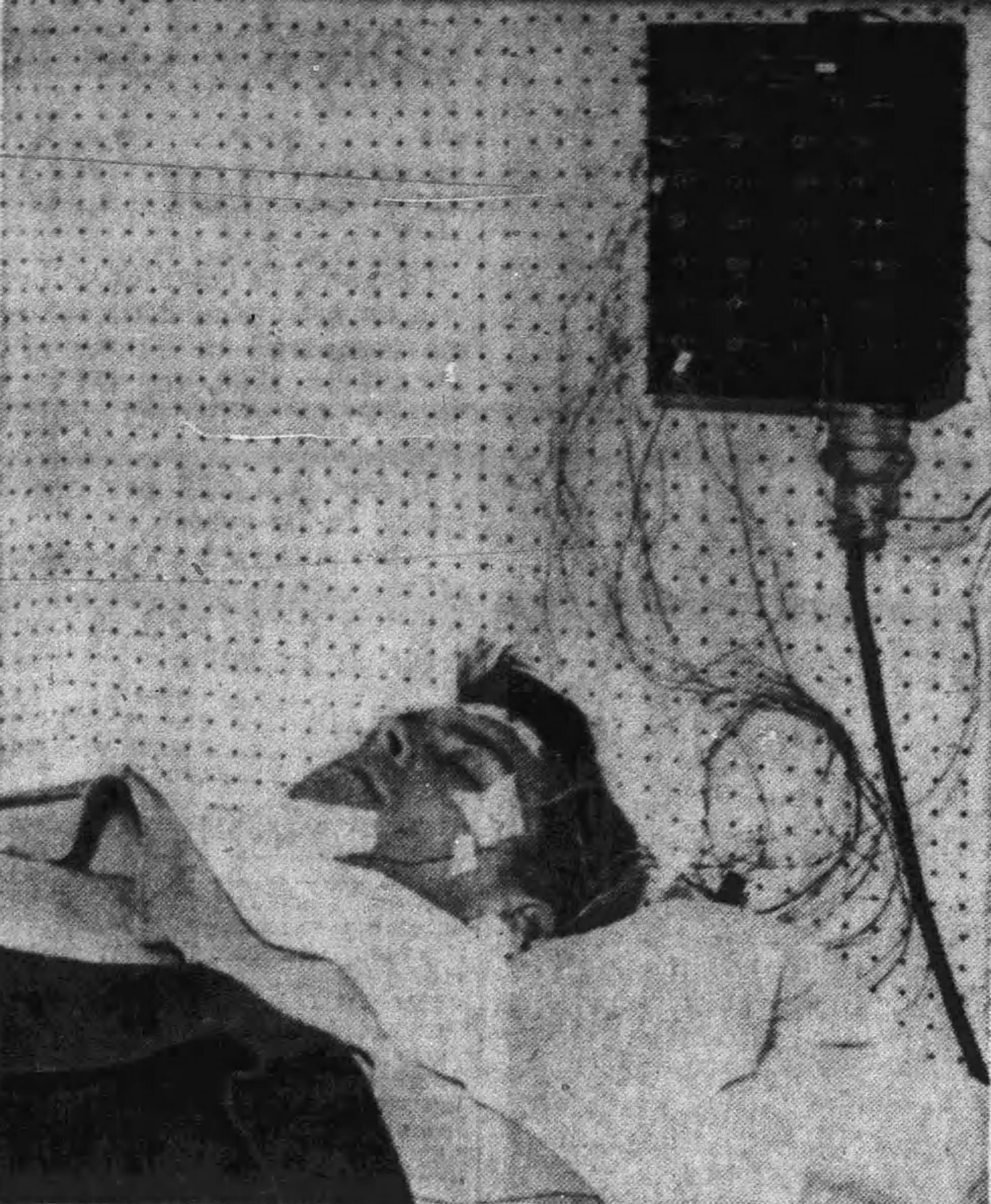
Gardner sleeping after the experiment

Gardner's sleep recovery was observed by sleep researchers who noted changes in sleep structure during post-deprivation recovery. After completing his record, Gardner slept for 14 hours and 46 minutes, awoke naturally around 8:40 p.m., and stayed awake until about 7:30 p.m. the next day, when he slept an additional ten and a half hours. Gardner appeared to have fully recovered from his loss of sleep, with follow-up sleep recordings taken one, six, and ten weeks after the fact, showing no significant differences.

However, in 2017, Gardner reported that he started experiencing serious insomnia around 2007, decades after his sleep experiment, and believed his participation in the 1960s sleep study was to blame.

== Subsequent record information ==
According to news reports, Gardner's record has been broken as described below for comparison. Gardner's case still stands out, however, because it has been so extensively documented. It is difficult to determine the accuracy of a sleep deprivation period unless the participant is carefully observed to detect short microsleeps, which the participant might not even notice. Also, records for voluntary sleep deprivation are no longer kept by Guinness World Records for fear that participants will suffer ill effects.

Some sources report that Gardner's record was broken a month later by Toimi Silvo, in Hamina, Finland, who stayed awake for 11 1/2 days, or 276 hours from February 5–15, 1964. The Guinness World Records record was set by Maureen Weston, of Peterborough, Cambridgeshire, England, on May 2, 1977, after presumably staying awake for 449 hours during a rocking-chair marathon.

More recently, on May 25, 2007, Tony Wright was reported to have exceeded Randy Gardner's feat in the incorrect belief that Gardner's record had not been beaten. He used 24-hour video for documentation. In August 2024, an online streamer livestreamed himself on YouTube and Kick where he stayed awake for 12 days, resulting in a welfare check by police and an ambulance arriving at his house. His YouTube stream was shut down by the platform, and was banned from Kick. He went to the emergency room after noticing his skin peeling off.
