= Tony Wright (sleep deprivation) =

British consciousness researcher

Tony Wright is an author and consciousness researcher from Penzance, Cornwall, England. He claims to hold the world record for sleep deprivation.

== Sleep deprivation record ==
Wright claimed the world sleep deprivation record in May 2007 with 266 continuous hours of sleeplessness. He based his record-breaking attempt on the belief that Randy Gardner was officially recognized by the Guinness World Records as holding the deprivation record of 264 hours. However, the Guinness record was actually for 11½ days, or 276 hours, and was set by Toimi Silvo in Hamina, Finland, from February 5–15, 1964, and Wright did not in fact break the Guinness record. However, Wright's friend Graham Gynn asserts that the Gardner record was the accepted record in the sleep research community. Regardless, Wright's record claim was not credited by the Guinness Book of Records, since after 1990 it no longer accepted records related to sleep deprivation due to the health risks.

== Theories ==
Wright claimed that his deliberate insomnia was made possible in part by his biochemically complex diet of raw foods (carrot juice, bananas, avocados, pineapple and nuts). He also asserted that his motivation for breaking the world sleep deprivation record was neither fame nor fortune, but that his intention was to promote his radical theories of human neurological degeneration that were proposed in his self-published book.
