= PGO waves =

Waves propagating between brain regions

Ponto-geniculo-occipital waves or PGO waves are distinctive wave forms of propagating activity between three key brain regions: the pons, lateral geniculate nucleus, and occipital lobe; specifically, they are phasic field potentials. These waves can be recorded from any of these three structures during and immediately before REM sleep. The waves begin as electrical pulses from the pons, then move to the lateral geniculate nucleus residing in the thalamus, and end in the primary visual cortex of the occipital lobe. The appearances of these waves are most prominent in the period right before REM sleep, albeit they have been recorded during wakefulness as well. They are theorized to be intricately involved with eye movement of both wake and sleep cycles in many different animals.

== Discovery ==
The discovery of PGO waves goes back to 1959, when three French scientists released their scientific article of their study of these waves in animal test subjects. Although at this time, they did not have a specific name for this neurological phenomenon.

It was not until the published work of Brooks and Bizzi that these waves became known as PGO waves. Their research focused on the propagation of these waves in cats, noticing that these field potentials started in the pons, propagating down to the lateral geniculate nucleus and the occipital lobe.

Other studies with these waves have been done on rats as well. Scientists tried to discern whether the rats had PGO waves, but learned that they are present only in the pons, and wave propagation does not excite any neurons in the lateral geniculate nucleus. As a result of this study, PGO waves are known as P waves in rodents.

PGO waves have been studied mostly through cat and rodent animal models. Despite the focus of the research, PGO waves have been found to exist in other mammalian species including humans and nonhuman primates, such as the macaque and baboon.

== Detection ==
In the original experiments, PGO waves (or P waves in rodent models) are found by placing electrodes inside the brain, next to either the pons, lateral geniculate nuclei, or occipital lobe. Along with electroencephalography (EEG) recording techniques, scientists are also able to show the correlation between other brain waves associated with REM sleep and PGO waves.

Although scientists know they exist, PGO waves have not been detected in healthy humans due to the ethical concerns about accessing these areas where the readings need to be taken from. However, advances in deep brain stimulation has made it possible to put electrodes inside the brains of humans with different pathologies and make EEG recordings of different nuclei. Due to the similarities with the animal models, we can infer that PGO waves are happening at the same frequency in human EEGs. Thus, scientists can infer that PGO waves exist in humans.

== Mechanism for generation and propagation ==
The neurophysiological studies on PGO waves conclude that the generation of these waves resides in a collection of neurons located in the pons, regardless of species research is done on. From this point, the neurons branch out in a network that leads the phasic electrical signal toward the lateral geniculate nucleus and the occipital lobe.

Within this network, there are two types of neuronal groups: executive neurons and modulatory neurons.

=== Executive neurons ===
These neurons are the ones that help to generate and propagate the PGO waves throughout the brain. One research paper further breaks down this "class" of neurons into two subsets: triggering neurons and transfer neurons. All of these neurons are located in the peribrachial area, which is a group of neurons surrounding the superior cerebellar peduncle.

==== Triggering neurons ====
These neurons are located in the caudolateral region of the peribrachial area. These neurons actively fire during non-REM (NREM) sleep. The most recorded activity of the neurons is during the N3 stage of NREM, also known as the slow-wave sleep cycle. These same neurons are also active during REM sleep, but at a greatly reduced amplitude than NREM sleep.

==== Transfer neurons ====
The neuronal cells that allow for the transfer of PGO waves from the pons to the other parts of the brain reside on the rostral portion of the peribrachial area. This grouping of cells fire in precisely two modes. The first mode is burst firing through low-threshold Calcium (Ca^{2+}) ion channels. The other mode is a repetitive tonic firing through Sodium (Na^{+}) dependent ion channels.

During the times when triggering neurons are firing, these cells receive those signals and begin increasing their firing. This, in turn, allows the wave to go out to the other portions of the brain.

=== Modulatory neurons ===
As the executive neurons are firing, the spread of the wave is controlled by both excitatory and inhibitory inputs. These inputs come from the modulatory neurons, which help to regulate and control the amplitude and frequency of the wave. The following types of cells play a huge part in this control process.

==== Aminergic neurons ====
Aminergic neurons are neurons that use monoamines as a neurotransmitter. This class of neurotransmitters is what keeps PGO wave amplitudes at very low levels during periods of a mammal being awake. The three specific aminergic neurotransmitters are serotonin, dopamine and norepinephrine.

==== Cholinergic neurons ====
Cholinergic neurons are neurons that use acetylcholine as a neurotransmitter. Through different studies, these types of neurons have been proven to promote PGO wave generation, thus being an excitatory neuromodulator for triggering neurons.

==== Nitroxergic neurons ====
Nitroxergic neurons use nitric oxide (NO) as a neurotransmitter. In theory, the increase of nitric oxide is seen as an excitatory neuromodulator in PGO wave generation. This stems from animal testing that has shown increases in PGO waves as nitric oxide levels were increased in the pons.

==== GABA-ergic neurons ====
GABA-ergic neurons use gamma-aminobutyric acid (GABA) as a neurotransmitter. These neurons are theorized to be inhibitory to aminergic neurons, and thus inhibitory to PGO wave propagation.

==== Vestibular nuclei ====
The neurons within the vestibular nuclei region of the brain have been shown to provide excitatory bouts of PGO wave generation when stimulated. The tests showed that, while the vestibular nuclei aided in creating PGO waves, the excitation of this area of the brain was in no way needed for PGO wave formation.

==== Amygdala ====
The neurons within the amygdala region of the brain have also been shown to provide excitatory bouts of PGO wave generation when electrically stimulated.

==== Suprachiasmatic nuclei ====
The neurons within the suprachiasmatic nuclei region of the brain help to regulate REM sleep. The REM sleep cycle length causes the frequency of PGO waves to be phase locked.

==== Auditory stimulation ====
The use of auditory stimulation has been shown to increase PGO waves during waking and sleeping cycles with neurons associated with transfers of auditory information. Even while the subject is awake and in total darkness, the amplitude of PGO waves increases by auditory stimulation. Another study also found that auditory stimulation increased the amplitude of PGO waves in slow-wave sleep and REM sleep and did not reduce the amplitude of the waves with repeated auditory stimulation. From this research, scientists can theorize that PGO wave generation from auditory stimulation contains a positive-feedback mechanism that can be excited by evoked PGO waves.

==== Basal ganglia ====
The basal ganglia are a group of nuclei in the brains of vertebrates, situated at the base of the forebrain and strongly connected with the cerebral cortex, thalamus and pons. The basal ganglia are associated with a variety of functions, including arousal, motor control and learning. The main components of the basal ganglia are the striatum, pallidum, substantia nigra, and subthalamic nucleus (or subthalamus). This latter, glutamatergic nucleus is reciprocally connected with the PGO-transferring nuclei of the pons. In humans, subthalamic PGO-like waves, that resemble the PGO waves typically recorded in cats, can be recorded during pre-REM and REM sleep. This suggests that the subthalamus may play an active role in an ascending activating network implicated in the rostral transmission of PGO waves during REM sleep in humans.

== REM sleep ==
PGO waves are an integral part of rapid eye movement (REM) sleep. As stated earlier, the density of the PGO waves coincides with the amount of eye movement measured in REM sleep. This has led some researchers to further theorize about the usefulness of PGO waves for dreaming.

One key use of REM sleep is for the brain to process and store information from the previous day. In a sense, the brain is learning by establishing new neuronal connections for things that have been learned. Neurophysiological studies have indicated a relationship between increased P-wave density during post-training REM sleep and learning performance. Basically, the abundance of PGO waves translates into longer periods of REM sleep, which thereby allows the brain to have longer periods where neuronal connections are formed.

The importance of PGO waves during REM sleep also aids the idea of PGO waves as a signal that a person is dreaming. Since dreaming occurs during REM sleep, the PGO waves are theorized to be the signals that make the brain start to recount the experiences from the previous day. This, in turn, allows us to "see" our dreams since our visual sense is quickly going through the information it has stored.

Another area of potential research interest involves PGO waves during lucid dreaming, active imagination and hallucination.

== Additional images ==
Human brain photos
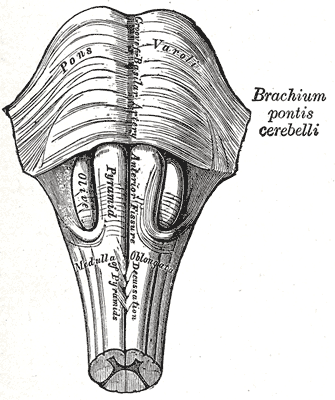
Anteroinferior view of the medulla oblongata and pons.

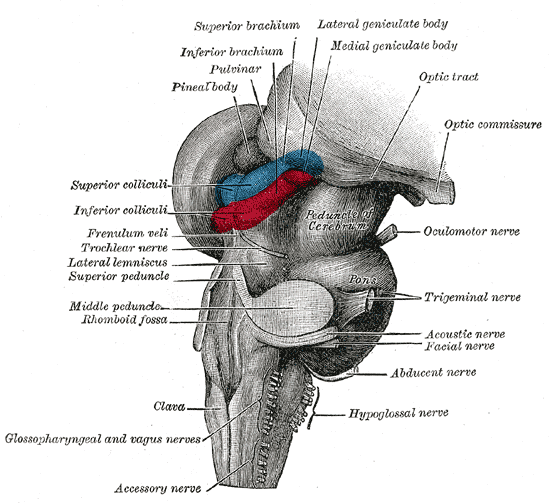
Hind- and mid-brains; postero-lateral view. (Lateral geniculate body visible near top.)

Lobes of the human brain (the occipital lobe is shown in red).

== See also ==
- Dream
- Electroencephalography (EEG)
- Sleep
- REM sleep
- NREM sleep
- Pons
- Lateral geniculate nucleus
- Occipital Lobe
- Subthalamic nucleus
- Alpha wave
- Beta wave
- Delta wave
- Gamma wave
- Mu wave
- Theta wave
