= Basic rest–activity cycle =

Hypothesized physiological process

The basic rest–activity cycle (BRAC) is a physiological arousal mechanism in humans proposed by Nathaniel Kleitman, hypothesized to occur during both sleep and wakefulness.

Empirically, it is an ultradian rhythm of approximately 90 minutes (80–120 minutes) characterized by different levels of excitement and rest. The cycle is mediated by the human biological clock. It is most readily observed in stages of sleep, for example, rapid eye movement sleep (REM) and the delta activity cycle.

When awake, brainwaves are faster during the first half of the cycle which corresponds to feeling alert and focused. During the last 20 minutes brainwaves slow and as the body feels dreamy or tired. In this phase the body is being readied for the alertness that comes at the beginning of the following cycle.

Kleitman hypothesized that the short-term 50-minute ultradian cycle of infants observed by researchers Denisova and Figurin ensured that a newborn infant would have frequent opportunities to respond to the stimulus of hunger pangs by waking up and crying, and would therefore get adequate nutrition. This hypothesis influenced him to consider BRAC as a fundamental human physiological process.

Kleitman concluded that BRAC tended to lengthen with age based on research published from Ohlmeyer and Brilmeyer.

As early as 1977, other investigators argued that there was no evidence for a "basic rest-activity cycle" outside of sleep cycles. More recent meta-analysis of studies suggest overwhelming evidence for ultradian cycles during wakefulness (affecting things like focus or reaction time) but that the daytime cycles operate via different mechanisms than those causing REM-NREM cycles at night. Despite research centering on the nocturnal evidence, the BRAC is often used as a time management and productivity tool.
