= REM rebound =

Increased frequency of REM after sleep deprivation

REM rebound is the lengthening and increasing frequency and depth of rapid eye movement (REM) sleep which occurs after periods of sleep deprivation. When people have been prevented from experiencing REM, they take less time than usual to attain the REM state. When people are unable to obtain an adequate amount of REM sleep, the pressure to obtain REM sleep builds up. When the subject is able to sleep, they will spend a higher percentage of the night in REM sleep.

After early research connected rapid eye movement with dreaming and established that it made up about 20% of normal human sleep, experimenters started depriving test subjects of only REM sleep, to test its unique importance. Every time a subject's electroencephalogram and eye movements indicated the beginning of REM sleep, the experimenter would thoroughly wake them for several minutes. As this "dream deprivation" continued, tendency to initiate REM increased, and the subjects were woken up more and more times each night. The subjects became irritable, anxious, and hungry, and several left the study early. After five nights, the remaining subjects were allowed to sleep undisturbed, and showed a significant increase in percentage of sleep devoted to REM: from an average of 19.4% to an average of 26.6%. These effects were significant in comparison with a control group woken up on an equal number of occasions each night, at arbitrary times.

The fact that REM rebound exists shows that sleep and achievement of specific sleep stages are needed by the brain. In some marine mammals, such as dolphins and fur seals, when one brain hemisphere is deprived of REM sleep, only the deprived hemisphere will go into REM rebound. The other hemisphere will be unaffected.

REM rebound is common to those who take certain sleeping aids and it is also often seen in the first few nights after patients with sleep apnea are placed on CPAP. Alcohol can also affect REM sleep; it suppresses it during the first half of the night, leading to a rebound four to five hours after sleep onset. Although alcohol can decrease the amount of time it takes to fall asleep, it will cause a disruption in the sleep cycles. REM sleep is decreased during the first half of the sleep period and stage 1 sleep is increased in the second half of the sleep period. Most antidepressants, in particular selective serotonin re-uptake inhibitors (SSRIs), such as citalopram and paroxetine, are potent inhibitors of REM sleep and may also cause a REM rebound on discontinuation.

== See also ==
- Sleep
- Rapid eye movement sleep (REM)
- Polysomnography
- Sleep disorder
- Sleep deprivation
