= William C. Dement =

American sleep researcher (1928–2020)

- Born: William Charles Dement; July 29, 1928; Wenatchee, Washington, U.S.
- Died: June 17, 2020 (aged 91); Stanford, California, U.S.
- Education: University of Chicago
- Scientific career
- Institutions: Stanford University

William Charles Dement (July 29, 1928 – June 17, 2020) was an American sleep researcher and founder of the Sleep Research Center at Stanford University. He was a leading authority on sleep, sleep deprivation and the diagnosis and treatment of sleep disorders such as sleep apnea and narcolepsy. For this pioneering work in a previously uncharted field in the United States, he is sometimes referred to as the American father of sleep medicine.

== Biography ==
Dement was born in Wenatchee, Washington, in 1928. In the 1950s, of those who also studied at the University of Chicago he was the first to intensively study the connection between rapid eye movement and dreaming. His fellow student Eugene Aserinsky had mentioned to him that "Dr. Kleitman and I think these eye movements might be related to dreaming". Aserinsky, along with his and Dement's adviser Nathaniel Kleitman, had previously noticed the connection but hadn't considered it very interesting. Dement had an interest in psychiatry, which in those days considered dreams to be important, so he was excited by the discovery and was eager to pursue it. From the University of Chicago, he received an MD in 1955 and a PhD in neurophysiology in 1957 for the thesis Rapid eye movements during sleep in schizophrenics and non-schizophrenics and their relation to dream recall supervised by Kleitman.

He began his work in sleep deprivation at Mount Sinai Hospital in the late 1950s – the early 1960s. In 1964, he monitored and assisted Randy Gardner's successful attempt to break the record for longest time without sleep. He was among the first researchers to study sleeping subjects with the electroencephalogram (EEG), and he wrote "I believe that the study of sleep became a true scientific field in 1953, when I finally was able to make all-night, continuous recordings of brain and eye activity during sleep." Studying these recordings, he discovered and named the five stages of sleep. In collaboration with Dr. Christian Guilleminault, Dement proposed the measure that is still used for the clinical definition of sleep apnea and the rating of its severity, the Apnea Hypopnea Index (AHI).

Dement, professor of psychiatry and behavioral sciences at Stanford University School of Medicine, taught the large and popular "Sleep and Dreams" course at Stanford, which started in 1971.

In 1975 he launched the American Sleep Disorders Association, now known as the American Academy of Sleep Medicine, and served as president for its first twelve years. In that same year he and Mary Carskadon invented the Multiple Sleep Latency Test used to measure sleepiness, a test of how quickly people fall asleep, sleep onset latency, during several daytime opportunities. He later was inducted to the Hall of Fame of the American Sleep and Breathing Academy (ASBA), and he gave his last conference lecture to healthcare professionals at the 2016 Annual Session of ASBA.

He was also chairman of the National Commission on Sleep Disorders Research, whose final report led directly to the creation of a new agency within the National Institutes of Health, the National Center on Sleep Disorders Research.

Dement was the author of The Promise of Sleep and The Sleepwatchers, and wrote the first undergraduate textbook in the field. The Promise of Sleep was featured in the 2012 independent comedy film Sleepwalk with Me, and Dement also made a cameo appearance in the film.

According to Robert Van de Castle, Dement was a heavy smoker who gave up the habit after dreaming he had lung cancer. Castle quotes Dement's book Some must watch while some must sleep, published in 1974, in which the author recounts a dream in which an X-ray of his chest, showed he had extensive lung cancer. In the dream, the cancer diagnosis was confirmed by a fellow doctor who conducted a physical examination. Dement experienced deep anguish in the dream, knowing that he would die, never to see his children grow up. On waking, however, he felt a sense of joy and relief that he could now alter the direction of his life. He immediately gave up smoking.

At the start of his academic career, he was a jazz musician and played bass. While at the University of Washington, he played with Quincy Jones, a time during which he also befriended Ray Charles. During the late 1980s, while at Stanford, he was known to have played, on at least one occasion, with artist-in-residence, Stan Getz.

He lived with his family in northern California. Dement died in Stanford, California, on June 17, 2020, from cardiovascular disease at the age of 91.

== Selected publications ==
- Dement, W; Kleitman, N (1957). "The relation of eye movements during sleep to dream activity: An objective method for the study of dreaming". Journal of Experimental Psychology. 53 (5): 339–346. doi:10.1037/h0048189. PMID 13428941.
- Dement, W; Kleitman, N (1957). "Cyclic variations in EEG during sleep and their relation to eye movements, body motility, and dreaming". Electroencephalography and Clinical Neurophysiology. 9 (4): 673–690. doi:10.1016/0013-4694(57)90088-3. PMID 13480240.
- Dement, W (1960). "The effect of dream deprivation". Science. 131 (3415): 1705–1707. Bibcode:1960Sci...131.1705D. doi:10.1126/science.131.3415.1705. PMID 13815805.
- Roffwarg, HP; Muzio, JN; Dement, WC (1966). "Ontogenetic development of the human sleep-dream cycle". Science. 152 (3722): 604–619. Bibcode:1966Sci...152..604R. doi:10.1126/science.152.3722.604. PMID 17779492.
- Dement, William C (1974). Some must watch while some must sleep. San Francisco: W.H. Freeman. ISBN 978-0-7167-0769-1.
- Guilleminault, C; Tilkian, A; Dement, WC (1976). "The sleep apnea syndromes". Annual Review of Medicine. 27: 465–484. doi:10.1146/annurev.me.27.020176.002341. PMID 180875.
- Carskadon, MA; Dement, WC; Mitler, MM; Roth, T; Westbrook, PR; Keenan, S (1986). "Guidelines for the multiple sleep latency test (MSLT): a standard measure of sleepiness". Sleep. 9 (4): 519–24. doi:10.1093/sleep/9.4.519. PMID 3809866.
- Dement, William C (1992). The sleepwatchers. Stanford, CA: Stanford Alumni Association. ISBN 978-0-916318-48-2.
- Dement, William C; Vaughan, Christopher (1999). The promise of sleep: a pioneer in sleep medicine explores the vital connection between health, happiness, and a good night's sleep. New York: Delacorte Press. ISBN 978-0-385-32008-5.
- Dement, WC (2005). "Sleep extension: getting as much extra sleep as possible". Clinics in Sports Medicine. 24 (2): 251–268, viii. doi:10.1016/j.csm.2004.12.014. PMID 15892922.
- Kryger, Meir H; Roth, Thomas; Dement, William C (2011). Principles and practice of sleep medicine (5th ed.). Philadelphia, PA: Saunders/Elsevier. ISBN 978-1-4160-6645-3.

== See also ==
- Sleep
- Sleep disorder
- Sleep onset latency
