= Eugene Aserinsky =

American sleep researcher (1921–1998)

- Born: May 6, 1921
- Died: July 22, 1998 (aged 77)
- Education: University of Chicago
- Scientific career
- Fields: Physiology

Eugene Aserinsky (May 6, 1921 – July 22, 1998), a pioneer in sleep research, was a graduate student at the University of Chicago in 1953 when he discovered REM sleep. He was the son of a dentist of Russian–Jewish descent. He made the discovery after hours spent studying the eyelids of sleeping subjects. While the phenomenon was in the beginning more interesting for a fellow of PhD student Aserinsky, William Charles Dement, both Aserinsky and their PhD adviser, Nathaniel Kleitman, went on to demonstrate that this "rapid-eye movement" was correlated with dreaming and a general increase in brain activity. Aserinsky and Kleitman pioneered procedures that have now been used with thousands of volunteers using the electroencephalograph. Because of these discoveries, Aserinsky and Kleitman are generally considered the founders of modern sleep research.

Eugene Aserinsky died on July 22, 1998, when his car hit a tree north of San Diego. An autopsy was inconclusive about the cause of the accident, but raised the possibility that it had resulted from him having fallen asleep at the wheel. He was 77 and lived in Escondido, California.
