= Rapid eye movement sleep =

Phase of sleep characterized by random and rapid eye movements

A sample hypnogram (electroencephalogram of sleep) showing sleep cycles characterized by increasing paradoxical (REM) sleep

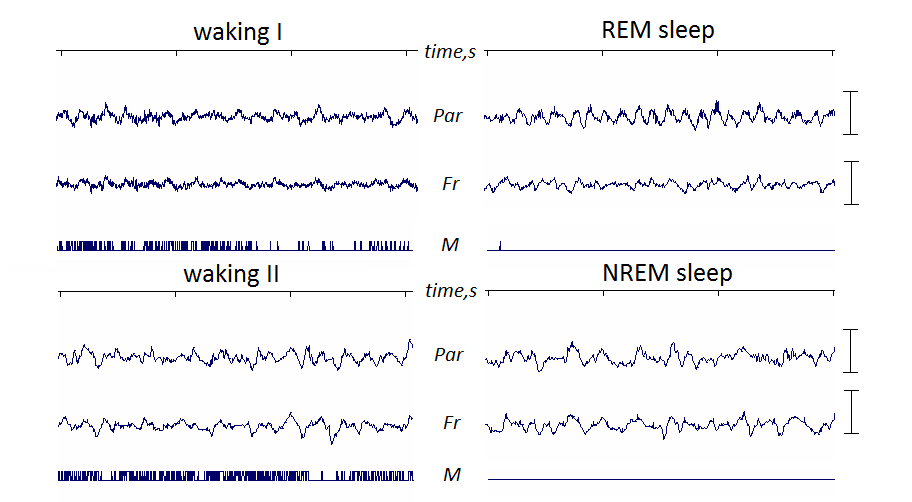
EEG of a mouse that shows REM sleep being characterized by prominent theta-rhythm

Rapid eye movement sleep (REM sleep or REMS) is a unique phase of sleep in all mammals (including humans) and birds as well as in some reptiles, characterized by random rapid movement of the eyes, accompanied by low muscle tone throughout the body, and the propensity of the sleeper to dream vividly. The core body and brain temperatures increase during REM sleep and skin temperature decreases to the lowest values.

The REM phase is also known as paradoxical sleep (PS) and sometimes desynchronized sleep or dreamy sleep, because of physiological similarities to waking states including rapid, low-voltage desynchronized brain waves. Electrical and chemical activity regulating this phase seem to originate in the brain stem, and is characterized most notably by an abundance of the neurotransmitter acetylcholine, combined with a nearly complete absence of monoamine neurotransmitters histamine, serotonin and norepinephrine. Experiences of REM sleep are not transferred to permanent memory due to absence of norepinephrine.

REM sleep is physiologically different from the other phases of sleep, which are collectively referred to as non-REM sleep (NREM sleep, NREMS, synchronized sleep). The absence of visual and auditory stimulation (sensory deprivation) during REM sleep can cause hallucinations. REM and non-REM sleep alternate within one sleep cycle, which lasts about 90 minutes in adult humans. As sleep cycles continue, they shift towards a higher proportion of REM sleep. The transition to REM sleep brings marked physical changes, beginning with electrical bursts called "ponto-geniculo-occipital waves" (PGO waves) originating in the brain stem. REM sleep occurs 4 times in a 7-hour sleep. Organisms in REM sleep suspend central homeostasis, allowing large fluctuations in respiration, thermoregulation and circulation which do not occur in any other modes of sleeping or waking. The body abruptly loses muscle tone, a state known as REM atonia.

In 1953, Professor Nathaniel Kleitman and his student Eugene Aserinsky defined rapid eye movement and linked it to dreams. REM sleep was further described by researchers, including William Dement and Michel Jouvet. Many experiments have involved awakening test subjects whenever they begin to enter the REM phase, thereby producing a state known as REM deprivation. Subjects allowed to sleep normally again usually experience a modest REM rebound. Techniques of neurosurgery, chemical injection, electroencephalography, positron emission tomography, and reports of dreamers upon waking have all been used to study this phase of sleep.

== Physiology ==
=== Electrical activity in the brain ===
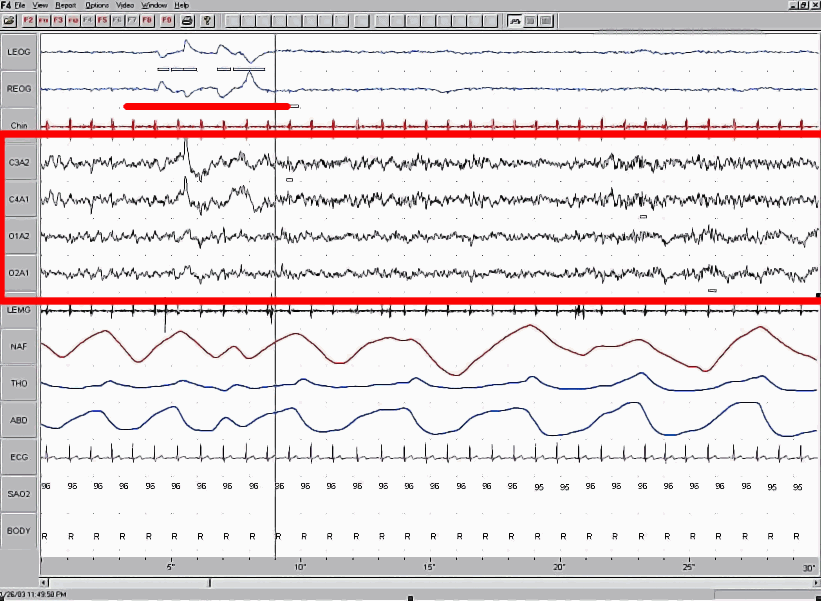
Polysomnographic record of REM Sleep. EEG highlighted by red box. Eye movement highlighted by red line.

REM sleep is called "paradoxical" because of its similarities to wakefulness. Although the body is paralyzed, the brain acts as if it is somewhat awake, with cerebral neurons firing with the same overall intensity as in wakefulness. Electroencephalography during REM sleep reveals fast, low amplitude, desynchronized neural oscillation (brainwaves) that resemble the pattern seen during wakefulness, which differ from the slow δ (delta) waves pattern of NREM deep sleep. An important element of this contrast is the 3–10 Hz theta rhythm in the hippocampus and 40–60 Hz gamma waves in the cortex; patterns of EEG activity similar to these rhythms are also observed during wakefulness. The cortical and thalamic neurons in the waking and REM sleeping brain are more depolarized (fire more readily) than in the NREM deep sleeping brain. Human theta wave activity predominates during REM sleep in both the hippocampus and the cortex.

During REM sleep, electrical connectivity among different parts of the brain manifests differently than during wakefulness. Frontal and posterior areas are less coherent in most frequencies, a fact which has been cited in relation to the chaotic experience of dreaming. However, the posterior areas are more coherent with each other; as are the right and left hemispheres of the brain, especially during lucid dreams.

Brain energy use in REM sleep, as measured by oxygen and glucose metabolism, equals or exceeds energy use in waking. The rate in non-REM sleep is 11–40% lower.

==== Brain stem ====
Neural activity during REM sleep seems to originate in the brain stem, especially the pontine tegmentum and locus coeruleus. REM sleep is punctuated and immediately preceded by PGO (ponto-geniculo-occipital) waves, bursts of electrical activity originating in the brain stem. (PGO waves have long been measured directly in cats but not in humans because of constraints on experimentation; however, comparable effects have been observed in humans during "phasic" events which occur during REM sleep, and the existence of similar PGO waves is thus inferred.) These waves occur in clusters about every 6 seconds for 1–2 minutes during the transition from deep to paradoxical sleep. They exhibit their highest amplitude upon moving into the visual cortex and are a cause of the "rapid eye movements" in paradoxical sleep. Other muscles may also contract under the influence of these waves.

==== Forebrain ====
Research in the 1990s using positron emission tomography (PET) confirmed the role of the brain stem and suggested that, within the forebrain, the limbic and paralimbic systems showed more activation than other areas. The areas activated during REM sleep are approximately inverse to those activated during non-REM sleep and display greater activity than in quiet waking. The "anterior paralimbic REM activation area" (APRA) includes areas linked with emotion, memory, fear and sex, and may thus relate to the experience of dreaming during REMS. More recent PET research has indicated that the distribution of brain activity during REM sleep varies in correspondence with the type of activity seen in the prior period of wakefulness.

The superior frontal gyrus, medial frontal areas, intraparietal sulcus, and superior parietal cortex, areas involved in sophisticated mental activity, show equal activity in REM sleep as in wakefulness. The amygdala is also active during REM sleep and may participate in generating the PGO waves, and experimental suppression of the amygdala results in less REM sleep. The amygdala may also regulate cardiac function in lieu of the less active insular cortex.

=== Chemicals in the brain ===
Compared to slow-wave sleep, both waking and paradoxical sleep involve higher use of the neurotransmitter acetylcholine, which may cause the faster brainwaves. The monoamine neurotransmitters norepinephrine, serotonin and histamine are completely unavailable. Injections of acetylcholinesterase inhibitor, which effectively increases available acetylcholine, have been found to induce paradoxical sleep in humans and other animals already in slow-wave sleep. Carbachol, which mimics the effect of acetylcholine on neurons, has a similar influence. In waking humans, the same injections produce paradoxical sleep only if the monoamine neurotransmitters have already been depleted.

Two other neurotransmitters, orexin and gamma-Aminobutyric acid (GABA), seem to promote wakefulness, diminish during deep sleep, and inhibit paradoxical sleep.

Unlike the abrupt transitions in electrical patterns, the chemical changes in the brain show continuous periodic oscillation.

==== Models of REM regulation ====
According to the activation-synthesis hypothesis proposed by Robert McCarley and Allan Hobson in 1975–1977, control over REM sleep involves pathways of "REM-on" and "REM-off" neurons in the brain stem. REM-on neurons are primarily cholinergic (i.e., involve acetylcholine); REM-off neurons activate serotonin and noradrenaline, which among other functions suppress the REM-on neurons. McCarley and Hobson suggested that the REM-on neurons actually stimulate REM-off neurons, thereby serving as the mechanism for the cycling between REM and non-REM sleep. They used Lotka–Volterra equations to describe this cyclical inverse relationship. Kayuza Sakai and Michel Jouvet advanced a similar model in 1981. Whereas acetylcholine manifests in the cortex equally during wakefulness and REM, it appears in higher concentrations in the brain stem during REM. The withdrawal of orexin and GABA may cause the absence of the other excitatory neurotransmitters; researchers in recent years increasingly include GABA regulation in their models.

=== Eye movements ===
Most of the eye movements in "rapid eye movement" sleep are in fact less rapid than those normally exhibited by waking humans. They are also shorter in duration and more likely to loop back to their starting point. About seven such loops take place over one minute of REM sleep. In slow-wave sleep, the eyes can drift apart; however, the eyes of the paradoxical sleeper move in tandem. These eye movements follow the ponto-geniculo-occipital waves originating in the brain stem. The eye movements themselves may relate to the sense of vision experienced in the dream, but a direct relationship remains to be clearly established. Congenitally blind people, who do not typically have visual imagery in their dreams, still move their eyes in REM sleep. An alternative explanation suggests that the functional purpose of REM sleep is for procedural memory processing, and the rapid eye movement is only a side effect of the brain processing the eye-related procedural memory.

=== Circulation, respiration, and thermoregulation ===
Generally speaking, the body suspends homeostasis during paradoxical sleep. Heart rate, cardiac pressure, cardiac output, arterial pressure, and breathing rate quickly become irregular when the body moves into REM sleep. In general, respiratory reflexes such as response to hypoxia diminish. Overall, the brain exerts less control over breathing; electrical stimulation of respiration-linked brain areas does not influence the lungs, as it does during non-REM sleep and in waking.

Erections of the penis (nocturnal penile tumescence or NPT) normally accompany REM sleep in rats and humans. If a male has erectile dysfunction (ED) while awake, but has NPT episodes during REM, it would suggest that the ED is from a psychological rather than a physiological cause. In females, erection of the clitoris (nocturnal clitoral tumescence or NCT) causes enlargement, with accompanying vaginal blood flow and transudation (i.e. lubrication). During a normal night of sleep, the penis and clitoris may be erect for a total time of from one hour to as long as three and a half hours during REM.

Body temperature is not well regulated during REM sleep, and thus organisms become more sensitive to temperatures outside their thermoneutral zone. Cats and other small furry mammals will shiver and breathe faster to regulate temperature during NREMS—but not during REMS. With the loss of muscle tone, animals lose the ability to regulate temperature through body movement. (However, even cats with pontine lesions preventing muscle atonia during REM did not regulate their temperature by shivering.) Neurons that typically activate in response to cold temperatures—triggers for neural thermoregulation—simply do not fire during REM sleep, as they do in NREM sleep and waking.

Consequently, hot or cold environmental temperatures can reduce the proportion of REM sleep, as well as amount of total sleep. In other words, if at the end of a phase of deep sleep, the organism's thermal indicators fall outside of a certain range, it will not enter paradoxical sleep lest deregulation allow temperature to drift further from the desirable value. This mechanism can be 'fooled' by artificially warming the brain.

=== Muscle ===
REM atonia, an almost complete paralysis of the body, is accomplished through the inhibition of motor neurons. When the body shifts into REM sleep, motor neurons throughout the body undergo a process called hyperpolarization: their already-negative membrane potential decreases by another 2–10 millivolts, thereby raising the threshold which a stimulus must overcome to excite them. Muscle inhibition may result from unavailability of monoamine neurotransmitters (restraining the abundance of acetylcholine in the brainstem) and perhaps from mechanisms used in waking muscle inhibition. The medulla oblongata, located between pons and spine, seems to have the capacity for organism-wide muscle inhibition. Some localized twitching and reflexes can still occur. Pupils contract.

Lack of REM atonia causes REM behavior disorder, where those affected physically act out their dreams, or conversely "dream out their acts", under an alternative theory on the relationship between muscle impulses during REM and associated mental imagery (which would also apply to people without the condition, except that commands to their muscles are suppressed). This is different from conventional sleepwalking, which takes place during slow-wave sleep, not REM. Narcolepsy, by contrast, seems to involve excessive and unwanted REM atonia: cataplexy and excessive daytime sleepiness while awake, hypnagogic hallucinations before entering slow-wave sleep, or sleep paralysis while waking. Other psychiatric disorders including depression have been linked to disproportionate REM sleep. Patients with suspected sleep disorders are typically evaluated by polysomnogram.

Lesions of the pons to prevent atonia have induced functional "REM behavior disorder" in animals.

== Psychology ==
=== Dreaming ===
Rapid eye movement sleep (REM) has since its discovery been closely associated with dreaming. Waking up sleepers during a REM phase is a common experimental method for obtaining dream reports; 80% of people can give some kind of dream report under these circumstances. Sleepers awakened from REM tend to give longer, more narrative descriptions of the dreams they were experiencing, and to estimate the duration of their dreams as longer. Lucid dreams are reported far more often in REM sleep. (In fact these could be considered a hybrid state combining essential elements of REM sleep and waking consciousness.) The mental events which occur during REM most commonly have dream hallmarks including narrative structure, convincingness (e.g., experiential resemblance to waking life), and incorporation of instinctual themes. Sometimes, they include elements of the dreamer's recent experience taken directly from episodic memory. By one estimate, 80% of dreams occur during REM.

Hobson and McCarley proposed that the PGO waves characteristic of "phasic" REM might supply the visual cortex and forebrain with electrical excitement which amplifies the hallucinatory aspects of dreaming. However, people woken up during sleep do not report significantly more bizarre dreams during phasic REMS, compared to tonic REMS. Another possible relationship between the two phenomena could be that the higher threshold for sensory interruption during REM sleep allows the brain to travel further along unrealistic and peculiar trains of thought.

Some dreaming can take place during non-REM sleep. "Light sleepers" can experience dreaming during stage 2 non-REM sleep, whereas "deep sleepers", upon awakening in the same stage, are more likely to report "thinking" but not "dreaming". Certain scientific efforts to assess the uniquely bizarre nature of dreams experienced while asleep were forced to conclude that waking thought could be just as bizarre, especially in conditions of sensory deprivation. Because of non-REM dreaming, some sleep researchers have strenuously contested the importance of connecting dreaming to the REM sleep phase. The prospect that well-known neurological aspects of REM do not themselves cause dreaming suggests the need to re-examine the neurobiology of dreaming per se. Some researchers (Dement, Hobson, Jouvet, for example) tend to resist the idea of disconnecting dreaming from REM sleep.

==== Effects of SSRIs ====
Previous research has shown that selective serotonin reuptake inhibitors (SSRIs) have an important effect on REM sleep neurobiology and dreaming. A study at Harvard Medical School in 2000 tested the effects of paroxetine and fluvoxamine on healthy young adult males and females for 31 days: a drug-free baseline week, 19 days on either paroxetine or fluvoxamine with morning and evening doses, and 5 days of absolute discontinuation. Results showed that SSRI treatment decreased the average amount of dream recall frequency in comparison to baseline measurements as a result of serotonergic REM suppression. Fluvoxamine increased the length of dream reporting, bizarreness of dreams as well as the intensity of REM sleep. These effects were the greatest during acute discontinuation compared to treatment and baseline days. However, the subjective intensity of dreaming increased and the proclivity to enter REM sleep was decreased during SSRI treatment compared to baseline and discontinuation days.

=== Creativity ===
After waking from REM sleep, the mind seems "hyperassociative"—more receptive to semantic priming effects. People awakened from REM have performed better on tasks like anagrams and creative problem solving.

Sleep aids the process by which creativity forms associative elements into new combinations that are useful or meet some requirement. This occurs in REM sleep rather than in NREM sleep. Rather than being due to memory processes, this has been attributed to changes during REM sleep in cholinergic and noradrenergic neuromodulation. High levels of acetylcholine in the hippocampus suppress feedback from hippocampus to the neocortex, while lower levels of acetylcholine and norepinephrine in the neocortex encourage the uncontrolled spread of associational activity within neocortical areas. This is in contrast to waking consciousness, where higher levels of norepinephrine and acetylcholine inhibit recurrent connections in the neocortex. REM sleep through this process adds creativity by allowing "neocortical structures to reorganise associative hierarchies, in which information from the hippocampus would be reinterpreted in relation to previous semantic representations or nodes."

== Timing ==
Sample hypnogram (electroencephalogram of sleep) showing sleep cycles characterized by increasing paradoxical (REM) sleep

In the ultradian sleep cycle, an organism alternates between deep sleep (slow, large, synchronized brain waves) and paradoxical sleep (faster, desynchronized waves). Sleep happens in the context of the larger circadian rhythm, which influences sleepiness and physiological factors based on timekeepers within the body. Sleep can be distributed throughout the day or clustered during one part of the rhythm: in nocturnal animals, during the day, and in diurnal animals, at night. The organism returns to homeostatic regulation almost immediately after REM sleep ends.

During a night of sleep, humans usually experience about four or five periods of REM sleep; they are shorter (~15 min) at the beginning of the night and longer (~25 min) toward the end. Many animals and some people tend to wake, or experience a period of very light sleep, for a short time immediately after a bout of REM. The relative amount of REM sleep varies considerably with age. A newborn baby spends more than 80% of total sleep time in REM.

REM sleep typically occupies 20–25% of total sleep in adult humans: about 90–120 minutes of a night's sleep. The first REM episode occurs about 70 minutes after falling asleep. Cycles of about 90 minutes each follow, with each cycle including a larger proportion of REM sleep. (The increased REM sleep later in the night is connected with the circadian rhythm and occurs even in people who did not sleep in the first part of the night.)

In the weeks after a human baby is born, as its nervous system matures, neural patterns in sleep begin to show a rhythm of REM and non-REM sleep. (In faster-developing mammals, this process occurs in utero.) Infants spend more time in REM sleep than adults. The proportion of REM sleep then decreases significantly in childhood. Older people tend to sleep less overall, but sleep in REM for about the same absolute time (and therefore spend a greater proportion of sleep in REM).

Rapid eye movement sleep can be subclassified into tonic and phasic modes. Tonic REM is characterized by theta rhythms in the brain; phasic REM is characterized by PGO waves and actual "rapid" eye movements. Processing of external stimuli is heavily inhibited during phasic REM, and recent evidence suggests that sleepers are more difficult to arouse from phasic REM than in slow-wave sleep.

== Deprivation effects ==
Selective REMS deprivation causes a significant increase in the number of attempts to go into REM stage while asleep. On recovery nights, an individual will usually move to stage 3 and REM sleep more quickly and experience a REM rebound, which refers to an increase in the time spent in REM stage over normal levels. These findings are consistent with the idea that REM sleep is biologically necessary. However, the "rebound" REM sleep usually does not last fully as long as the estimated length of the missed REM periods.

After the deprivation is complete, mild psychological disturbances, such as anxiety, irritability, hallucinations, and difficulty concentrating may develop and appetite may increase. There are also positive consequences of REM deprivation. Some symptoms of depression are found to be suppressed by REM deprivation; aggression may increase, and eating behavior may get disrupted. Higher norepinepherine is a possible cause of these results. Whether and how long-term REM deprivation has psychological effects remains a matter of controversy. Several reports have indicated that REM deprivation increases aggression and sexual behavior in laboratory test animals. Rats deprived of paradoxical sleep die in 4–6 weeks (twice the time before death in case of total sleep deprivation). Mean body temperature falls continually during this period.

It has been suggested that acute REM sleep deprivation can improve certain types of depression—when depression appears to be related to an imbalance of certain neurotransmitters. Although sleep deprivation in general annoys most of the population, it has repeatedly been shown to alleviate depression, albeit temporarily. More than half the individuals who experience this relief report it to be rendered ineffective after sleeping the following night. Thus, researchers have devised methods such as altering the sleep schedule for a span of days following a REM deprivation period and combining sleep-schedule alterations with pharmacotherapy to prolong this effect. Antidepressants (including selective serotonin reuptake inhibitors, tricyclics, and monoamine oxidase inhibitors) and stimulants (such as amphetamine, methylphenidate and cocaine) interfere with REM sleep by stimulating the monoamine neurotransmitters which must be suppressed for REM sleep to occur. Administered at therapeutic doses, these drugs may stop REM sleep entirely for weeks or months. Withdrawal causes a REM rebound. Sleep deprivation stimulates hippocampal neurogenesis much as antidepressants do, but whether this effect is driven by REM sleep in particular is unknown.

== In other animals ==
Ostriches sleeping, with REM and slow-wave sleep phases

Rapid eye movement of a dog

Although it manifests differently in different animals, REM sleep or something like it occurs in all land mammals—as well as in birds. The primary criteria used to identify REM are the change in electrical activity, measured by EEG, and loss of muscle tone, interspersed with bouts of twitching in phasic REM.

The amount of REM sleep and cycling varies among animals; predators experience more REM sleep than prey. Larger animals also tend to stay in REM for longer, possibly because higher thermal inertia of their brains and bodies allows them to tolerate longer suspension of thermoregulation. The period (full cycle of REM and non-REM) lasts for about 90 minutes in humans, 22 minutes in cats, and 12 minutes in rats. In utero, mammals spend more than half (50–80%) of a 24-hour day in REM sleep.

Sleeping reptiles do not seem to have PGO waves or the localized brain activation seen in mammalian REM. However, they do exhibit sleep cycles with phases of REM-like electrical activity measurable by EEG. A recent study found periodic eye movements in the central bearded dragon of Australia, leading its authors to speculate that the common ancestor of amniotes may therefore have manifested some precursor to REMS.

Observations of jumping spiders in their nocturnal resting position also suggest a REM sleep-like state characterized by bouts of twitching and retinal movements and hints of muscle atonia (legs curling up as a result of pressure loss caused by muscle atonia in the prosoma).

Sleep deprivation experiments on non-human animals can be set up differently than those on humans. The "flower pot" method involves placing a laboratory animal above water on a platform so small that it falls off upon losing muscle tone. The naturally rude awakening which results may elicit changes in the organism which necessarily exceed the simple absence of a sleep phase. This method also stops working after about 3 days as the subjects (typically rats) lose their will to avoid the water. Another method involves computer monitoring of brain waves, complete with automatic mechanized shaking of the cage when the test animal drifts into REM sleep.

== Possible functions ==
Some researchers argue that the perpetuation of a complex brain process such as REM sleep indicates that it serves an important function for the survival of mammalian and avian species. It fulfills important physiological needs vital for survival to the extent that prolonged REM sleep deprivation leads to death in experimental animals. In both humans and experimental animals, REM sleep loss leads to several behavioral and physiological abnormalities. Loss of REM sleep has been noticed during various natural and experimental infections. Survivability of the experimental animals decreases when REM sleep is totally attenuated during infection; this leads to the possibility that the quality and quantity of REM sleep is generally essential for normal body physiology. Further, the existence of a "REM rebound" effect suggests the possibility of a biological need for REM sleep.

While the precise function of REM sleep is not well understood, several theories have been proposed.

=== Memory ===
Sleep in general aids memory. REM sleep may favor the preservation of certain types of memories: specifically, procedural memory, spatial memory, and emotional memory. In rats, REM sleep increases following intensive learning, especially several hours after, and sometimes for multiple nights. Experimental REM sleep deprivation has sometimes inhibited memory consolidation, especially regarding complex processes (e.g., how to escape from an elaborate maze). In humans, the best evidence for REM's improvement of memory pertains to learning of procedures—new ways of moving the body (such as trampoline jumping), and new techniques of problem solving. REM deprivation seemed to impair declarative (i.e., factual) memory only in more complex cases, such as memories of longer stories. REM sleep apparently counteracts attempts to suppress certain thoughts.

According to the dual-process hypothesis of sleep and memory, the two major phases of sleep correspond to different types of memory. "Night half" studies have tested this hypothesis with memory tasks either begun before sleep and assessed in the middle of the night, or begun in the middle of the night and assessed in the morning. Slow-wave sleep, part of non-REM sleep, appears to be important for declarative memory. Artificial enhancement of the non-REM sleep improves the next-day recall of memorized pairs of words. Tucker et al. demonstrated that a daytime nap containing solely non-REM sleep enhances declarative memory—but not procedural memory. According to the sequential hypothesis, the two types of sleep work together to consolidate memory.

Sleep researcher Jerome Siegel has observed that extreme REM deprivation does not significantly interfere with memory. One case study of an individual who had little or no REM sleep due to a shrapnel injury to the brainstem did not find the individual's memory to be impaired. Antidepressants, which suppress REM sleep, show no evidence of impairing memory and may improve it.

Graeme Mitchison and Francis Crick proposed in 1983 that by virtue of its inherent spontaneous activity, the function of REM sleep "is to remove certain undesirable modes of interaction in networks of cells in the cerebral cortex"—a process they characterize as "unlearning". As a result, those memories which are relevant (whose underlying neuronal substrate is strong enough to withstand such spontaneous, chaotic activation) are further strengthened, whilst weaker, transient, "noise" memory traces disintegrate. Memory consolidation during paradoxical sleep is specifically correlated with the periods of rapid eye movement, which do not occur continuously. One explanation for this correlation is that the PGO electrical waves, which precede the eye movements, also influence memory. REM sleep could provide a unique opportunity for "unlearning" to occur in the basic neural networks involved in homeostasis, which are protected from this "synaptic downscaling" effect during deep sleep.

=== Neural ontogeny ===
REM sleep prevails most after birth, and diminishes with age. According to the "ontogenetic hypothesis", REM (also known in neonates as active sleep) aids the developing brain by providing the neural stimulation that newborns need to form mature neural connections. Sleep deprivation studies have shown that deprivation early in life can result in behavioral problems, permanent sleep disruption, and decreased brain mass. The strongest evidence for the ontogenetic hypothesis comes from experiments on REM deprivation, and from the development of the visual system in the lateral geniculate nucleus and primary visual cortex.

=== Defensive immobilization ===
Ioannis Tsoukalas of Stockholm University has hypothesized that REM sleep is an evolutionary transformation of a well-known defensive mechanism, the tonic immobility reflex. This reflex, also known as animal hypnosis or death feigning, functions as the last line of defense against an attacking predator and consists of the total immobilization of the animal so that it appears dead. Tsoukalas argues that the neurophysiology and phenomenology of this reaction shows striking similarities to REM sleep; for example, both reactions exhibit brainstem control, cholinergic neurotransmission, paralysis, hippocampal theta rhythm, and thermoregulatory changes.

=== Shift of gaze ===
According to "scanning hypothesis", the directional properties of REM sleep are related to a shift of gaze in dream imagery. Against this hypothesis is that such eye movements occur in those born blind and in fetuses in spite of lack of vision. Also, binocular REMs are non-conjugated (i.e., the two eyes do not point in the same direction at a time) and so lack a fixation point. In support of this theory, research finds that in goal-oriented dreams, eye gaze is directed towards the dream action, determined from correlations in the eye and body movements of REM sleep behavior disorder patients who enact their dreams.

=== Oxygen supply to cornea ===
Dr. David M. Maurice, an eye specialist and former adjunct professor at Columbia University, proposed that REM sleep was associated with oxygen supply to the cornea, and that aqueous humor, the liquid between cornea and iris, was stagnant if not stirred. Among the supportive evidence, he calculated that if aqueous humor was stagnant, oxygen from the iris had to reach the cornea by diffusion through aqueous humor, which was not sufficient. According to the theory, when the organism is awake, eye movement (or cool environmental temperature) enables the aqueous humor to circulate. When the organism is sleeping, REM provides the much needed stir to aqueous humor. This theory is consistent with the observation that fetuses, as well as eye-sealed newborn animals, spend much time in REM sleep, and that during a normal sleep, a person's REM sleep episodes become progressively longer deeper into the night. However, owls experience REM sleep, but do not move their head more than in non-REM sleep and it is well known that owls' eyes are nearly immobile.

=== Other theories ===
Another theory suggests that monoamine shutdown is required so that the monoamine receptors in the brain can recover to regain full sensitivity.

The sentinel hypothesis of REM sleep was put forward by Frederick Snyder in 1966. It is based upon the observation that REM sleep in several mammals (the rat, the hedgehog, the rabbit, and the rhesus monkey) is followed by a brief awakening. This does not occur for either cats or humans, although humans are more likely to wake from REM sleep than from NREM sleep. Snyder hypothesized that REM sleep activates an animal periodically, to scan the environment for possible predators. This hypothesis does not explain the muscle paralysis of REM sleep; however, a logical analysis might suggest that the muscle paralysis exists to prevent the animal from fully waking up unnecessarily, and allowing it to return easily to deeper sleep.

Jim Horne, a sleep researcher at Loughborough University, has suggested that REM in modern humans compensates for the reduced need for wakeful food foraging.

Other theories are that REM sleep warms the brain, stimulates and stabilizes the neural circuits that have not been activated during waking, or creates internal stimulation to aid development of the CNS; while some argue that REM lacks any purpose, and simply results from random brain activation.

Furthermore, eye movements are also theorized to play a role in certain psychotherapies such as eye movement desensitization and reprocessing (EMDR).

== See also ==
- Neuroscience of sleep
- Pedunculopontine nucleus (PPN)
- Sleep and learning
- Sleep study
