= Non-rapid eye movement sleep =

Form of sleep involving negligible eye movement

Simplified hypnogram with NREM stages.

Non-rapid eye movement sleep (NREM), also known as quiescent sleep, is, collectively, sleep stages 1–3, previously known as stages 1–4. Rapid eye movement sleep (REM) is not included. There are distinct electroencephalographic and other characteristics seen in each stage. Unlike REM sleep, there is usually little or no eye movement during these stages. Dreaming occurs during both sleep states, and muscles are not paralyzed as in REM sleep. People who do not go through the sleeping stages properly get stuck in NREM sleep, and because muscles are not paralyzed a person may be able to sleepwalk. According to studies, the mental activity that takes place during NREM sleep is believed to be thought-like, whereas REM sleep includes hallucinatory and bizarre content. NREM sleep is characteristic of dreamer-initiated friendliness, compared to REM sleep where it is more aggressive, implying that NREM is in charge of simulating friendly interactions. The mental activity that occurs in NREM and REM sleep is a result of two different mind generators, which also explains the difference in mental activity. In addition, there is a parasympathetic dominance during NREM. The reported differences between the REM and NREM activity are believed to arise from differences in the memory stages that occur during the two types of sleep.

== Stages ==
NREM sleep was divided into four stages in the Rechtschaffen and Kales (R&K) standardization of 1968. That has been reduced to three in the 2007 update by The American Academy of Sleep Medicine (AASM).

- Stage 1 – occurs mostly in the beginning of sleep, with slow eye movement. This state is sometimes referred to as relaxed wakefulness. Alpha waves disappear and the theta wave appears. People aroused from this stage often believe that they have been fully awake. During the transition into stage-1 sleep, it is common to experience hypnic jerks. Hypnagogic hallucinations are often associated with this stage.
- Stage 2 – no eye movement occurs, and dreaming is very rare. The sleeper is quite easily awakened. EEG recordings tend to show characteristic "sleep spindles", which are short bursts of high frequency brain activity, and "K-complexes" during this stage.
- Stage 3 – previously divided into stages 3 and 4, is deep sleep, slow-wave sleep (SWS). Stage 3 was formerly the transition between stage 2 and stage 4 where delta waves, associated with "deep" sleep, began to occur, while delta waves dominated in stage 4. In 2007, these were combined into just stage 3 for all of deep sleep. Dreaming is more common in this stage than in other stages of NREM sleep though not as common as in REM sleep. The content of SWS dreams tends to be disconnected, less vivid, and less memorable than those that occur during REM sleep. This is also the stage during which parasomnias most commonly occur.

== Sleep spindles and K-complexes ==
Sleep spindles are unique to NREM sleep. The most spindle activity occurs at the beginning and the end of NREM. Sleep spindles involve activation in the brain in the areas of the thalamus, anterior cingulate and insular cortices, and the superior temporal gyri. They have different lengths. There are slow spindles in the range of 11 – 13 Hz that are associated with increased activity in the superior frontal gyrus, and fast spindles in the range of 13 – 15 Hz that are associated with recruitment of sensorimotor processing cortical regions, as well as recruitment of the mesial frontal cortex and hippocampus. There is no clear answer as to what these sleep spindles mean, but ongoing research hopes to illuminate their function.

K-complexes are single long delta waves that last for only a second. They are also unique to NREM sleep. They appear spontaneously across the early stages, usually in the second stage, much like the sleep spindles. However, unlike sleep spindles, they can be voluntarily induced by transient noises such as a knock at the door. The function of these K-complexes is unknown and further research needs to be conducted.

== Dreaming ==
Although study participants' reports of intense dream vividness during REM sleep and increased recollection of dreams occurring during that phase suggest that dreaming most commonly occurs during that stage, dreaming can also occur during NREM sleep, in which dreams tend to be more mundane in comparison. It was initially thought that NREM sleep is the absence of dreaming, or dreams occur more rarely compared to REM sleep because 90–95% of those who wake up in the middle of REM sleep will report that they have had a dream, but only 5–10% of those waking up in the middle of non-REM sleep will report they've had a dream. However, when asked for more general thought processes or feelings, 70% of people who awaken from NREM sleep reports of having dream-like feelings, which is characteristic of NREM dreams, potentially disproving that theory.

Research has also shown that dreams during the NREM stage most commonly occur during the morning hours which is also the time period with the highest occurrence of REM sleep. This was found through a study involving subjects taking naps over specific intervals of time and being forcefully awakened, their sleep was separated into naps including only REM sleep and only NREM sleep using polysomnography. This implies that the polysomnographic occurrence of REM sleep is not required for dreaming. Rather, the actual mechanisms that create REM sleep cause changes to one's sleep experience. Through these changes, by morning, a sub-cortical activation may occur during NREM that is comparable to the type that occurs during REM. Such a sub-cortical activation may result in dreaming during the NREM stage during the morning hours.

=== Self in dreaming ===
It is suggested that dreaming involves two selfs: aggressive self (REM) and friendly self (NREM). It seems that in NREM dreams, the self is put in different situations, largely negative, but is found to respond in a way that befriends or embraces the unfamiliar. It is sometimes thought that in NREM sleep, the dreamers are "aware of being aware", also known as "secondary awareness", which allows them to make better decisions and potentially reflect on them.

== Muscle movements ==
During non-REM sleep, the tonic drive to most respiratory muscles of the upper airway is inhibited. This has two consequences:

1. The upper airway becomes more floppy.
2. The rhythmic innervation results in weaker muscle contractions because the intracellular calcium levels are lowered, as the removal of tonic innervation hyperpolarizes motoneurons, and consequently, muscle cells.

However, because the diaphragm is largely driven by the autonomous system, it is relatively spared of non-REM inhibition. As such, the suction pressures it generates stay the same. This narrows the upper airway during sleep, increasing resistance and making airflow through the upper airway turbulent and noisy. For example, one way to determine whether a person is sleeping is to listen to their breathing - once the person falls asleep, their breathing becomes noticeably louder. Not surprisingly, the increased tendency of the upper airway to collapse during breathing in sleep can lead to snoring, a vibration of the tissues in the upper airway. This problem is exacerbated in overweight people when sleeping on the back, as extra fat tissue may weigh down on the airway, closing it. This can lead to sleep apnea.

== Parasomnias ==
The occurrence of parasomnias is very common in the last stage of NREM sleep. Parasomnias are sleep behaviors that affect the function, quality, or timing of sleep, caused by a physiological activation in which the brain is caught between the stages of falling asleep and waking. The autonomous nervous system, cognitive process, and motor system are activated during sleep or while the person wakes up from sleep.

Some examples of parasomnias are somnambulism (sleep walking), somniloquy (sleep talking), sleep eating, nightmares or night terrors, sleep paralysis, and sexsomnia (or "sleep sex"). Many of these have a genetic component, and can be quite damaging to the person with the behavior or their bed partner. Parasomnias are most common in children, but most children have been found to outgrow them with age. However, if not outgrown, they can cause other serious problems with everyday life.

== Polysomnography ==
Polysomnography (PSG) is a sleep study test used in the study of sleep; the test result is called a polysomnogram. Below are images of the NREM stages 1, 2 and 3.

The figures represent 30-second epochs (30 seconds of data). They represent data from both eyes, EEG, chin, microphone, EKG, legs, nasal/oral air flow, thermistor, thoracic effort, abdominal effort, oximetry, and body position, in that order. EEG is highlighted by the red box. Sleep spindles in the stage 2 figure are underlined in red.

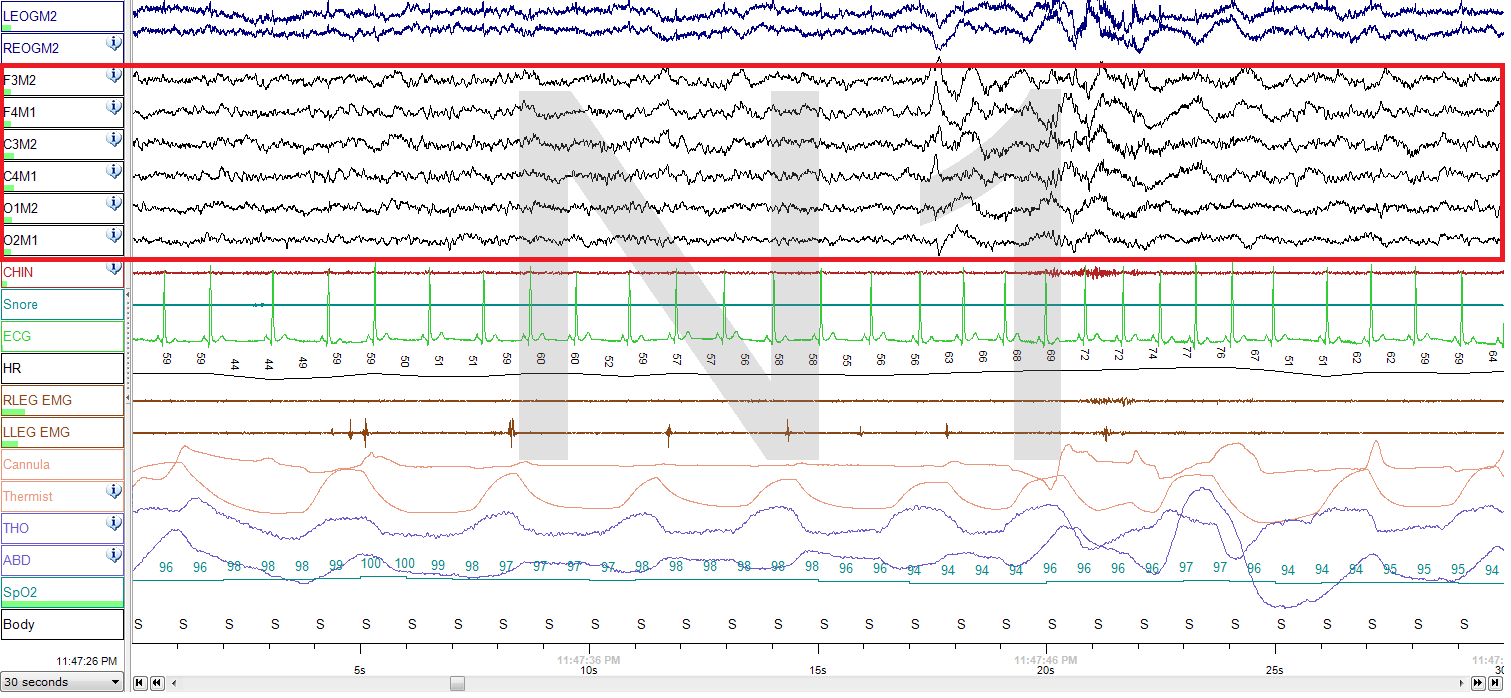
Stage N1:

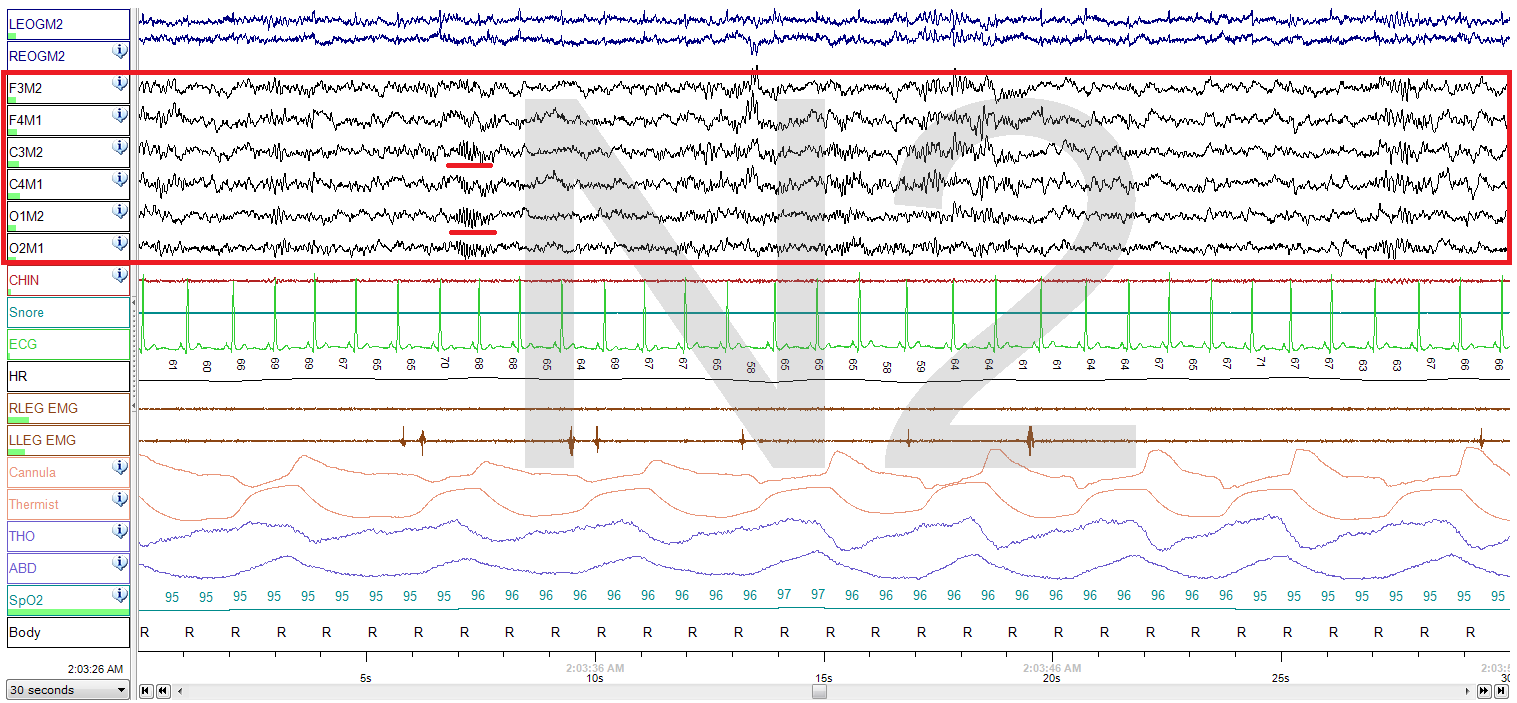
Stage N2:

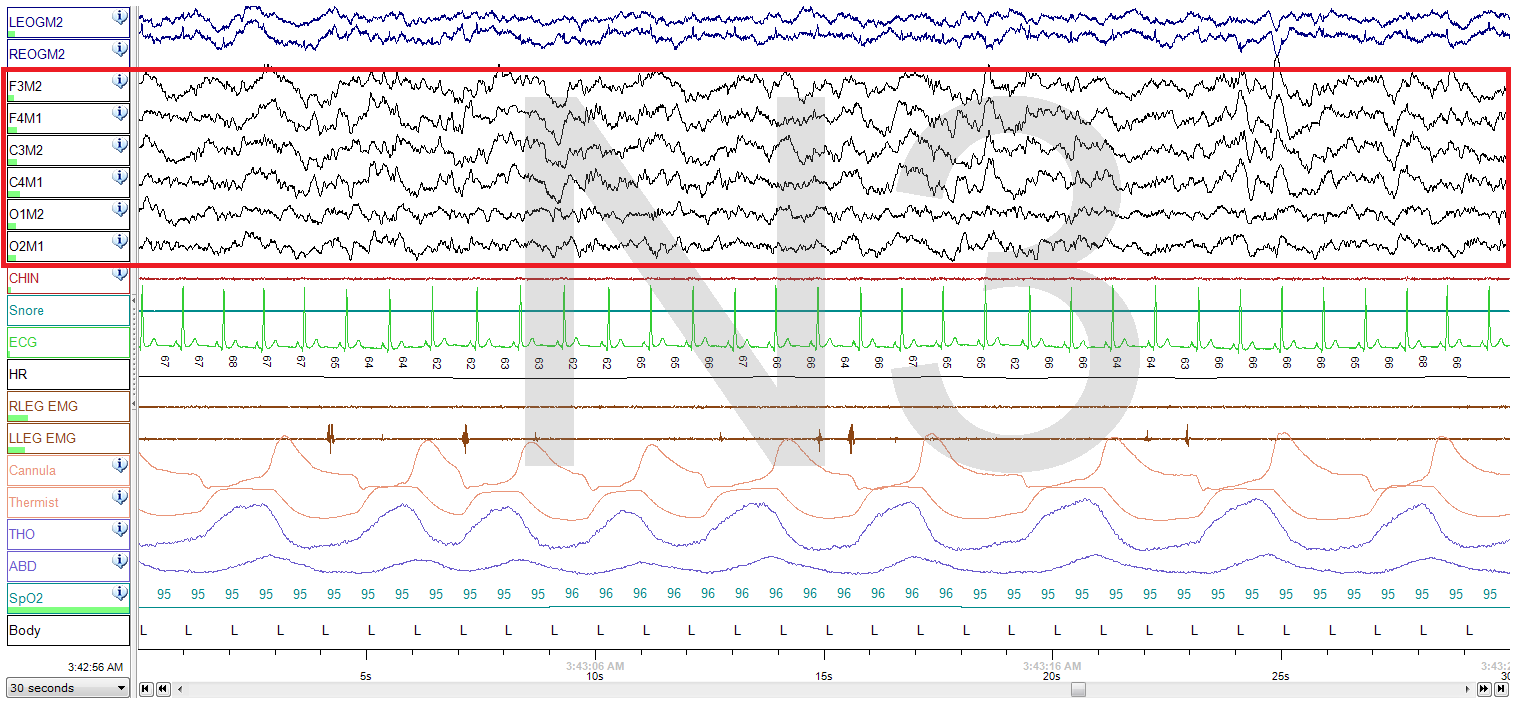
Stage N3:

== Slow-wave sleep ==
Slow-wave sleep (SWS) is made up of the deepest stage of NREM, and is often referred to as deep sleep.

The highest arousal thresholds (e.g. difficulty of awakening, such as by a sound of a particular volume) are observed in stage 3. A person will typically feel groggy when awakened from this stage, and indeed, cognitive tests administered after awakening from stage 3 indicate that mental performance is somewhat impaired for periods up to 30 minutes or so, relative to awakenings from other stages. This phenomenon has been called "sleep inertia."

After sleep deprivation there is usually a sharp rebound of SWS, suggesting there is a "need" for this stage.

Slow Wave Sleep (SWS) is a highly active state unlike a state of brain quiescence as previously thought. Brain imaging data has shown that during NREM sleep the regional brain activity is influenced by the waking experience just passed.

A study was done involving an experimental and a control group to have them learn to navigate a 3D maze. The blood flow in the parahippocampal gyrus increased in conjunction with the individual's performance through the 3D maze. Participants were then trained in the maze for 4 hours and later, during the various sleep cycles of NREM sleep, REM sleep and wakefulness, they were scanned twelve times using a PET scan during the night. The PET scan demonstrated a higher blood flow in the hippocampus during SWS/NREM sleep due to the training from the previous day while the control group exhibited no increased blood flow and they had not received the training the prior day. The brain activity during sleep, according to this study, would show the events of the previous day do make a difference. One theory suggests a model of hippocampal-neocortical dialogue. "Two stages of hippocampal activity have been proposed, the first being the recording of the memory during waking and the second involving the playback of the memory during NREM sleep. This process of reactivation of memory firing sequences is believed to gradually reinforce initially weak connections between neocortical sites allowing the original information to be activated in the cortex independently of the hippocampus, and thus ensuring refreshed encoding capacity of the hippocampus." Maquet concluded that the areas of the brain involved with information processing and memory have increased brain activity during the slow wave sleep period. Events experienced in the previous day have more efficient and clearer memory recall the next day thus indicating that the memory regions of the brain are activated during SWS/NREM sleep instead of being dormant as previously thought.

NREM SWS, also known as slow wave activity (SWA), is regarded as highly important in brain development due not only to its homeostatic behavior but also because of its distinct correlation with age. Children sleep longer and deeper than adults. The difference in depth of sleep has been quantified by EEG recordings of SWA. An increase in SWA peaks just before puberty and exponentially decreases from adolescence to adulthood in both longitudinal and cross-sectional studies of typically developing participants. This phenomenon is understood as memories and learned skills being metabolized during NREM sleep; the decrease in SWA is considered a reflection of synaptic rewiring and, therefore, an effect of behavioral maturation concluding. The critical period from childhood to emerging adulthood is also considered a sensitive period for mental disorders to manifest. For example, children with attention deficit hyperactivity disorder (ADHD), a brain disorder that affects cognitive and motor control, have shown considerably different cortical thickening trajectories in contrast with typically developing children per MRI data. Cortical thickness is a common measure of brain maturation; the main difference in children with ADHD shows a delay in cortical thickness, specifically in the frontal lobe. Significant correlations in the trajectory of gray matter thickness and SWA suggest that SWA may be able to indicate levels of cortical maturation on an individual level. However, there has yet to be a study in which the diagnosis of ADHD can be given directly from SWA readings.

== Memory ==
Non-rapid eye movement sleep is known for its beneficial effect on memory consolidation, especially for declarative memory (while procedural memory improvement is more associated with REM-sleep), even if establishing a clear-cut distinction between stages' influence on type of learning may not be possible.

Generally, both REM and NREM are associated with an increased memory performance, because newly encoded memories are reactivated and consolidated during sleep.

NREM sleep has been demonstrated to be intimately correlated with declarative memory consolidation in various studies, where subject slept after a declarative memory-task; these who had a sleep imbued of NREM stages, had a better performance after the nap or the night, compared to subjects who have been awake or had more REM-sleep.

The importance of NREM sleep in memory consolidation has also been demonstrated using cueing; in this paradigm, while participants are sleeping and are in NREM sleep stages, cues are proposed (which can be, for example, aurally-presented sounds or words, odors, and so on). The fact that this procedure was effective on the improvement of the later memory performance, indicates that during these stages, there is a reactivation of the memory traces and a subsequent consolidation, which are facilitated by the cues; importantly, this does not work if the cueing is presented when subjects are awake or in REM stages.

Furthermore, the specific and crucial role of SWS (Slow-Wave Sleep, a stage of NREM sleep) in memory consolidation has been demonstrated in a study where, through electrical stimulations, slow oscillations were induced and boosted; because of this SWA increase, participants had a better performance in declarative memory tasks. Not only SWA helps learning, but it is also crucial, because its suppression has been demonstrated to impair declarative memory consolidation.

On the other hand, sleep spindles (especially associated with N2 NREM sleep stage, but can also occur during N3 NREM sleep stage) are also crucial for declarative consolidation; indeed they are enhanced (increasing in density) after declarative learning, their increase is associated with a better memory performance (which has been proved using pharmacological manipulation of spindles' density, and measuring outcomes on learning tasks).

=== A working model of sleep and memory stabilization ===
Schreiner and Rasch (2017) proposed a model illustrating how the cueing beneficial effect on memory during sleep could function, which includes theta and gamma waves and sleep spindles.

Increased theta activity represents the successful reestablishment of the memory after the cueing: if such an increase is observed, it means that the association between the cue and the memory trace is strong enough, and that the cue is presented in an effective way and time. Theta waves interacts with gamma activity, and - during NREM - this oscillatory theta-gamma produces the relocation of the memory representation, from the hippocampus to the cortex. On the other hand, sleep spindles increase occurs right after or in parallel to the theta augmentation, and is a necessary mechanism for the stabilization, the reinforcement and also the integration of the newly encoded memory trace.

Importantly, in this working model, slow oscillations have the role of a 'time-giving pace maker', and seem to be a prerequisite for the success of cueing.

According to this model, enhancing only slow waves or only spindles, is not sufficient to improve memory function of sleep: both need to be increased to obtain an influence and this latter.

== NREM in other animals ==
Not much is known about NREM, so scientists have conducted studies in other animals to potentially understand more, in particular why the brain has evolved to have two distinct states. In their studies, it was found that between birds and certain mammals like dolphins, their brains exhibit similar behavior. It was found that certain species of birds have half their brain's hemisphere release brain waves similar to a human's during NREM sleep, and the other half of it fully conscious, allowing them to fly while sleeping. Certain species of dolphins also exhibit similar behavior as birds in order to be able to swim while sleeping.

In rats, after a 24-hour sleep deprivation, it was found that there was an increase of slow-wave activity in NREM sleep, which corresponds directly with the human brain which when sleep deprived, prioritizes NREM sleep over REM sleep, implying that the NREM sleep is responsible for regulating and compensating for missed sleep.
