= Nathaniel Kleitman =

American physiologist and sleep researcher (1895–1999)

- Born: April 26, 1895; Chișinău, Bessarabia Governorate, Russian Empire
- Died: August 13, 1999 (aged 104); Los Angeles, California, U.S.
- Education: University of Chicago (PhD); Columbia University; City College of New York
- Known for: Discovery of REM and other foundational contributions to sleep research
- Scientific career
- Workplaces: University of Chicago

Nathaniel Kleitman (April 26, 1895 – August 13, 1999) was an American physiologist and sleep researcher who served as Professor Emeritus in Physiology at the University of Chicago. He is recognized as the father of modern sleep research, and is the author of the seminal 1939 book Sleep and Wakefulness.

== Biography ==
=== Early life ===
Nathaniel Kleitman was born in Chișinău, also known as Kishinev, the capital of the province of Bessarabia (Moldova), in 1895 to a Jewish family. He was deeply interested in consciousness and reasoned that he could get insight in consciousness by studying the unconsciousness of sleep. Pogroms drove him to Palestine, and in 1915 he emigrated to the United States as a result of World War I. At the age of twenty, he landed in New York City penniless; in 1923, at age twenty-eight, he had worked his way through City College of New York and earned a PhD from the University of Chicago's Department of Physiology. His thesis was "Studies on the physiology of sleep." Soon after, in 1925, he joined the faculty there. An early sponsor of Kleitman's sleep research was the Wander AG company, which manufactured Ovaltine and hoped to promote it as a remedy for insomnia.

=== REM sleep ===
Eugene Aserinsky, one of Kleitman's graduate students, decided to hook sleepers up to an early version of an electroencephalogram machine, which scribbled across 1/2 mile (800 m) of paper each night. In the process, Aserinsky noticed that several times each night the sleepers went through periods when their eyes darted wildly back and forth. Kleitman insisted that the experiment be repeated yet again, this time on his daughter, Esther. In 1953, he and Aserinsky introduced the world to "rapid-eye movement," or REM sleep. Kleitman and Aserinsky demonstrated that REM sleep was correlated with dreaming and brain activity. Another of Kleitman's graduate students, William C. Dement, who was a professor of psychiatry at the Stanford medical school, described this as the year that "the study of sleep became a true scientific field."

=== Rest activity cycle ===
Kleitman made countless additional contributions to the field of sleep research and was especially interested in "rest-activity" cycles, leading to many fundamental findings on circadian and ultradian rhythms. Kleitman proposed the existence of a Basic rest activity cycle, or BRAC, during both sleep and wakefulness.

=== Other experiments ===
Kleitman also conducted sleep studies underground in Mammoth Cave, Kentucky and lesser-known studies underwater in submarines during World War II and above the Arctic Circle.

== See also ==
- Chronotype
