= Effects of sleep deprivation in space =

Studies, which include laboratory investigations (Category I) and field evaluations (Category II and Category III) of population groups that are analogous to astronauts (e.g., medical and aviation personnel), provide compelling evidence that working long shifts for extended periods of time contributes to sleep deprivation and can cause performance decrements, health problems, and other detrimental consequences, including accidents, that can affect both the worker and others.

== Performance errors relative to sleep loss and extended wakefulness ==
A meta-analysis (Category I) that was conducted by Pilcher and Huffcutt examined data that were drawn from 19 research studies to characterize the effects of sleep deprivation on specific types of human performance. Motor skills, cognitive skills, and mood were assessed in terms of: partial sleep derivation (also known as sleep deprivation), which is defined as fewer than 5 hours of sleep in a 24-hour period for 1 or more days; short-term total sleep deprivation (no sleep attained for fewer than 45 hours); and long-term sleep deprivation (no sleep attained for a period in excess of 45 hours). These researchers found that sleep-deprived subjects performed considerably worse on motor tasks, cognitive tasks, and measures of mood than did non-sleep-deprived subjects. The greatest impact on cognitive performance was seen from multiple days of partial sleep deprivation, although short- and long-term sleep deprivation also showed an effect. Meta-analyses of sleep deprivation effects in medical residents found deficits in both laboratory tasks and clinical tasks.

The magnitude of the chronic partial sleep loss has been experienced by astronauts in flight has been reported to negatively impact cognitive performance in multiple Category I, Category II and Category III laboratory and field studies. Performance can be affected whether sleep loss is in the form of a night of substantially reduced sleep, a night of total sleep deprivation, or a series of less drastic, but more chronic, restricted sleep hours. A 1997 study by Dinges et al. revealed that when sleep is restricted to the level that is commonly experienced by astronauts, a "sleep debt" accrues and, in less than 1 week, performance deficits during waking hours reach levels of serious impairment.

Chronic reduction of sleep can impact performance in a manner that is similar to that of total sleep deprivation. A study by Van Dongen et al., which used 48 subjects, evaluated the specific performance effects of chronic sleep restriction in comparison to the effects of 3 nights of total sleep deprivation. Sleep restriction conditions included 14 consecutive nights of 8, 6, or 4 hours of sleep opportunity, with actual sleep quantity validated by polysomnography recordings. Subjects who were subjected to sleep restriction conditions underwent neurobehavioral assessments every 2 hours during their scheduled wakefulness, while subjects who were subjected to the sleep deprivation condition were tested every 2 hours throughout their total 88 hours of sleep deprivation.

The neurobehavioral assessment battery that was used in the Van Dongen et al. study included the psychomotor vigilance task (PVT). The PVT - which determines alertness and the effects of fatigue on cognitive performance (as determined by lapses in response time and accuracy of responses) by measuring the speed with which subjects respond to a visual or auditory stimulus (by pressing a response button) - has become a standard laboratory tool for the assessment of sustained performance in a variety of experimental conditions. The PVT detects changes in basic neurobehavioral performance that involve vigilant attention, response speed, and impulsivity; and it has been extensively validated in ground-based laboratory studies to detect cognitive deficits that are caused by a variety of factors (e.g., restricted sleep, sleep/wake shifts, motion sickness, residual sedation from sleep medications). The PVT is an optimal tool for repeated use, in contrast to some other cognitive measures, as studies have shown no minimal learning effects and aptitude differences when using the PVT.

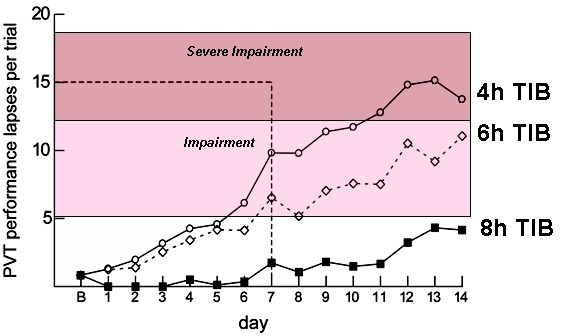
Figure 3–2. Performance lapses for time in bed (TIB) over 14 days of sleep restriction.

Results from these laboratory studies indicate that multiple consecutive sleep episodes of 4 or 6 hours significantly erode performance on the PVT and on measures of working memory, and that performance under these two conditions (i.e., 4 or 6 hours) was comparable to the performance that is found under conditions of 1 to 2 days of total sleep deprivation. Surprisingly, by the end of the 14 days of sleep restriction, subjects in the 4- and 6-hour sleep period conditions reported feeling only slightly sleepy. As these reports were taken when performance was at its lowest level, this indicates that the subjects may no longer have been aware of their performance deficits because of inadequate recovery sleep (figure 3–2).

Subjects who spent 4 hours in bed reached levels of impairment at 6 days and of severe impairment at 11 days. Subjects who spent 6 hours in bed reached levels of impairment at 7 days. It appears that subjects who spent 8 hours in bed approached levels of impairment. Figure 3-3, which is from Belenky et al., however, demonstrates that subjects who spent 9 hours in bed did not approach these levels of impairment, indicating that 9 hours in bed may be needed to alleviate the risk of performance errors.

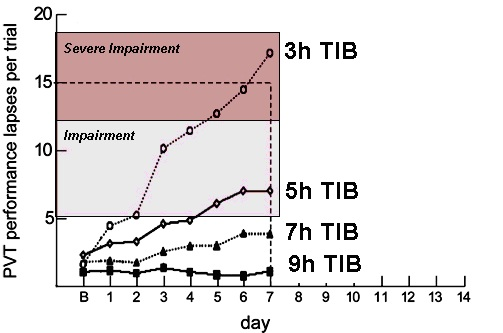
Figure 3-3. PVT performance lapses for TIB over 7 days sleep restriction.

Similar performance effects resulting from chronically restricted can also be seen in the Category I study by Belenky et al. and in figure 3-3. This study involved 66 subjects who were observed in four conditions (i.e., 3, 5, 7 and 9 hours in bed) for 7 days. PVT testing showed severe impairments in reaction time under the 3-hour condition, with lapses in responses increasing steadily across the 7 days of sleep restriction. Subjects who spent 3 hours in bed reached levels of severe impairment at 5 days, while subjects who spent 5 hours in bed reached levels of impairment at 4 days.

These Category I laboratory studies by Van Dongen et al. and Belenky et al. clearly show that subjects suffered performance impairments resulting from total sleep deprivation and/or chronic sleep restriction.

Cognitive impairments are present even after an individual has been awake for approximately 17 hours; in fact, recent studies have shown that these decrements are similar to those that result from an elevated blood alcohol level. A compelling Category I laboratory study from Williamson and Feyer used a cross-over randomized control design to observe cognitive and motor performance after minor sleep deprivation to performance after alcohol consumption. All subjects participated in both alcohol consumption and sleep deprivation, and the order of testing was counterbalanced so that half of the subjects participated in the alcohol consumption part first while the other half participated in the sleep deprivation part first. To avoid carry-over effects from one condition to the next, subjects were provided with a night of rest in a motel between each condition.

Results indicate that, on average, performance with a blood alcohol level of 0.05% remained equivalent to performance after being awake for 16.9 to 18.6 hours. Performance with a blood alcohol level of 0.1% was equivalent to performance after being awake for 17.7 to 19.7 hours, or to restricted sleep of 4 to 5 hours per night for 1 week. Similar studies that compare performance after a time of sleep deprivation to performance with elevated blood alcohol level have confirmed these results. These findings are compelling as the duration of wakefulness (17 hours), which results in decrements that are similar to those that are induced by a 0.05% blood alcohol level, is considered by many to be within the range of a "normal" waking "day"; many individuals can recall an incident in which they had to waken early in the morning and work all day into the night. Astronauts, who sleep on average of 6 hours per night, may be performing critical tasks 17 hours or more after wakening.

== Performance errors relative to sleep desynchronization and work overload ==
Research suggests that circadian desynchronization and work overload may also impair performance. Specifically, a controlled laboratory study by Wright et al. evaluated the relationship between circadian rhythms and performance by assessing body temperature, which is regulated by the circadian mechanisms of the body. Body temperature is at its highest near the circadian peak and lowest near the circadian minimum (this is when the body is driven to sleep). It has long been recognized that a positive relationship exists between daily rhythms of the body temperature and neurobehavioral performance and alertness in humans.

The study protocol forced circadian desynchronization for 12 consecutive 28-hour days; participants were allowed 9.3 hours of scheduled time in bed and 18.7 hours of scheduled wakefulness. Performance on validated measures was evaluated every 2 hours, beginning 2 hours after the scheduled wake time. The protocol, therefore, assessed performance when the body is normally driven to sleep (which is related to the point at which body temperature is at its lowest) relative to performance during normal waking hours, and allowed for assessment of the effects of body temperature independent of (and associated with) sleep hours and time of day. During the circadian peak ( when body temperature is high), performance and alertness are high; conversely, near the circadian phase of low body temperature, performance and alertness are low. These results have been replicated in other forced desynchrony and extended wakefulness laboratory protocols.

Results from these laboratory protocols can be extrapolated to field conditions. Studies in the medical industry, where highly educated and trained individuals (e.g., physicians) are subject to circadian shifting and extended work shifts in addition to sleep loss, further demonstrate serious performance errors with populations that are analogous to astronauts. In a two-session, with subject, Category II experiment that was conducted by Arnedt et al., the performance of 34 medical interns was observed under four conditions:

- after 4 weeks of a light rotation (averaging 44 hours of rotations/week)
- after 4 weeks of a heavy rotation (averaging 80 hours of rotations/week)
- after 4 weeks of a heavy rotation with a 0.05% blood alcohol level
- after 4 weeks of a light rotation with a 0.05% blood alcohol level

Performance measures included the PVT and a simulated driving task. Findings of the Arnedt et al. experiment indicate that performance impairment after a heavy-call rotation is comparable to the impairment that is associated with a combined 0.04% to 0.05% blood alcohol level and a light-call rotation. Results of this experiment demonstrate that decrements that are created by extended work shifts are similar to the decrements that are created by elevated blood alcohol levels.

Work hours and sleep loss were shown to impact performance in a Category III evaluation by Rogers et al. A total of 393 registered nurses logged scheduled hours worked, actual hours worked, time of day worked, overtime, days off, and sleep/wake patterns. Questions concerning errors and near-errors were also included. Analysis showed that work duration, overtime, and number of hours worked per week significantly affected the number of errors. The likelihood of making an error increased with longer work hours, and was three times higher when the nurses worked shifts lasting 12.5 hours or more. Working overtime increased the odds of making at least one error, regardless of the originally scheduled length of the shift. Working more than 40 and more than 50 hours per week significantly increased the risk of making an error.

Similar findings were attained in a subsequent Category III evaluation of 2,737 medical interns. A Web-based survey was conducted across the U.S. in which interns completed 17,003 confidential monthly reports. These 60-item reports contained information concerning work hours, sleep, and activities during the month, number of days off, and the number of extended-duration work shifts (defined as at least 24 hours of continuous work). These interns were also asked to report whether they had made significant fatigue-related or non-fatigue-related medical errors. Other questions assessed how often they had nodded off or fallen asleep during patient care or educational activities.

Analysis revealed a significant relationship between the number of extended-duration work shifts and the reported rates of fatigue-related noteworthy medical errors. Specifically, the number of reported fatigue-related medical errors increased as the number of extended-duration shifts per month increased. At least one fatigue-related significant medical error was reported in 3.8% of months with no extended-duration work shifts; and at least one fatigue-related significant medical error was reported in 9.8% of months that had between one and four extended-duration work shifts and in 16% of months that had five or more extended-duration work shifts. Furthermore, the frequency of attentional failures was strongly associated with the frequency of extended-duration work shifts. Evidence from this study further corroborates the negative impact that extended-duration work shifts may have on performance, as well as increased accidents and injuries.

Working extended hours or overnight shifts also poses the added difficulty of requiring performance from an individual at a time with the body is driven to sleep by the circadian system. Sleep, alertness, and cognitive functioning are determined by the interaction of two processes: the endogenous circadian pacemaker and the homeostatic drive for sleep. The endogenous circadian pacemaker generates the 24-hour circadian rhythm that regulates subjective alertness and sleep propensity as well as core body temperature, cognitive functions, and melatonin secretion, as described above. It is also highly sensitive to light, which is its primary synchronization. Misalignment of the circadian rhythm results in disturbed sleep, impaired performance alertness, waking-hour melatonin secretion, and reduced levels of nocturnal secretion of growth hormone. The outcome, therefore, can range from performance error to long-term health decrements.

Individuals who work at night and attempt to sleep during the day suffer because the timing of their sleep/wake schedule remains out of phase with the timing of the environmental light. Night workers are particularly prone to vehicle accidents, and their decreased alertness, performance, and vigilance are likely to blame for a higher rate of industrial accidents and quality control errors on the job, injuries and a general decline in work productivity rate. Recent information also suggests that as the body normally releases melatonin when it is dark, working under artificial like at night suppresses the released of melatonin, which may increase the risk of developing cancer.

In summation, ground-based evidence demonstrates that sleep loss, circadian desynchronization, and extended work shifts lead to increased performance errors and accidents. The extent to which these risk factors are also present in the space flight environment is therefore an important consideration.

== See also ==
- Effects of sleep deprivation on cognitive performance
- Shift work sleep disorder
- Sleep deprivation
- Skylab 4
