= Sleep in space =

Part of space medicine

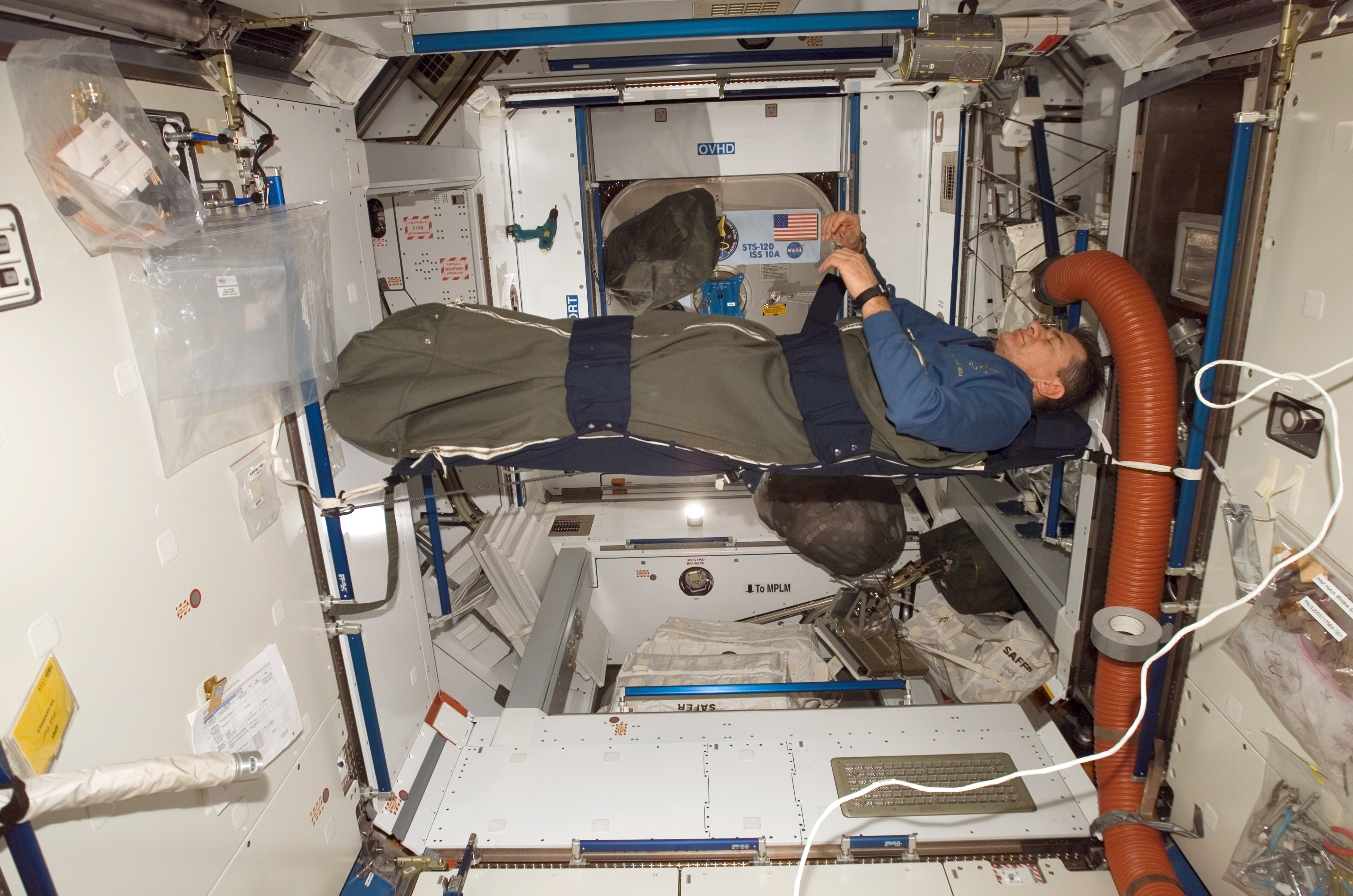
An astronaut asleep in the microgravity of Earth orbit-continual free-fall around the Earth, inside the pressurized module Harmony node of the International Space Station in 2007

Sleeping in space is part of space medicine and mission planning, with impacts on the health, capabilities and morale of astronauts.

Human spaceflight often requires astronaut crews to endure long periods without rest. Studies have shown that lack of sleep can cause fatigue that leads to errors while performing critical tasks. Also, individuals who are fatigued often cannot determine the degree of their impairment. Astronauts and ground crews frequently suffer from the effects of sleep deprivation and circadian rhythm disruption. Fatigue due to sleep loss, sleep shifting and work overload could cause performance errors that put space flight participants at risk of compromising mission objectives as well as the health and safety of those on board.

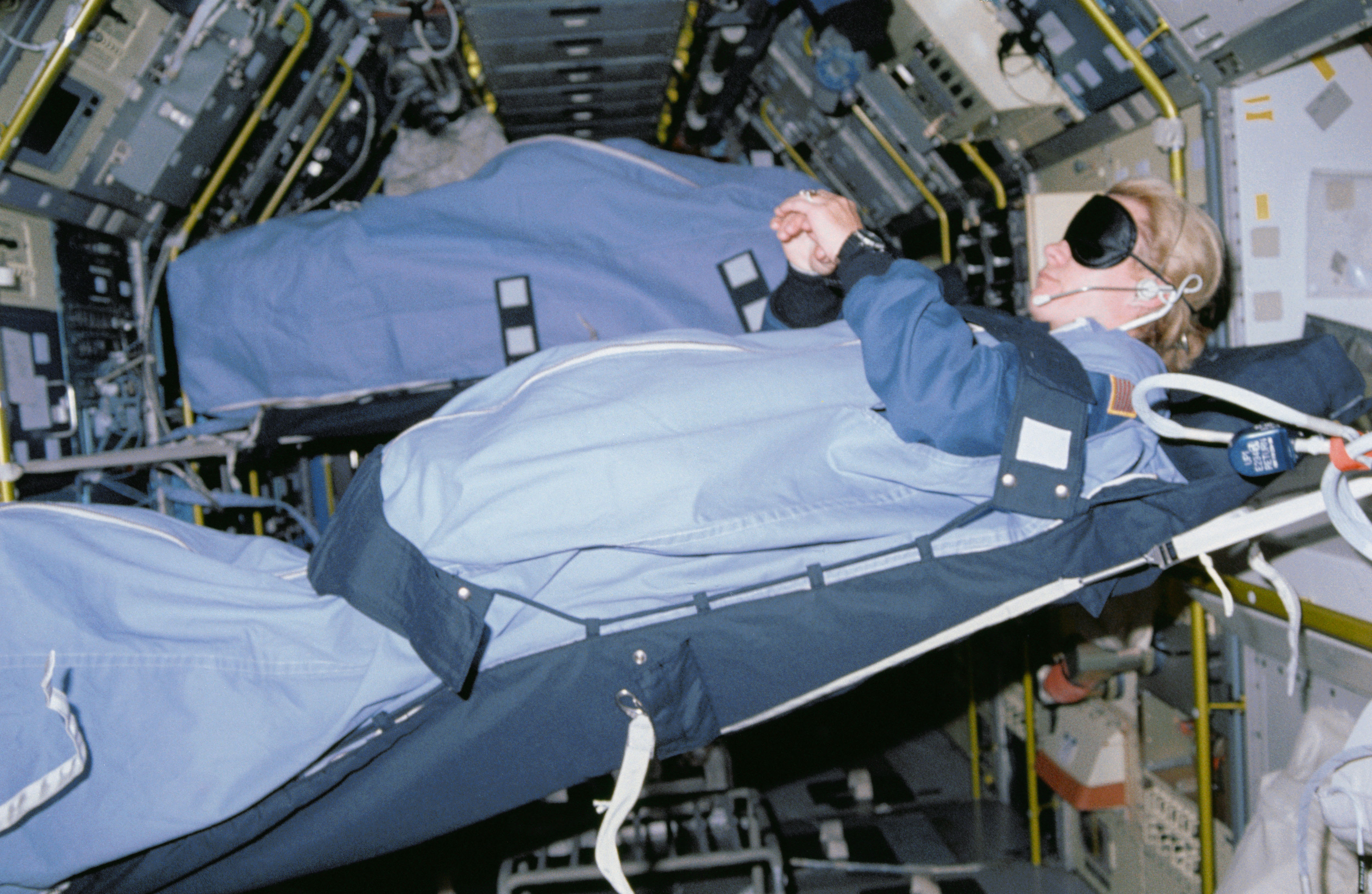
Mission Specialist Margaret Rhea Seddon, wearing a blindfold, sleeps in SLS-1 module (STS-40)

== Description ==
Sleeping in space requires that astronauts sleep in a crew cabin, a small room about the size of a shower stall or telephone booth. They lie in a sleeping bag which is strapped to the wall. Astronauts have reported having nightmares and dreams, and snoring while sleeping in space.

Sleeping and crew accommodations need to be well-ventilated. Crew on the ISS average about six hours of sleep per day.

== On the ground ==
Chronic sleep loss can impact performance similarly to total sleep loss and recent studies have shown that cognitive impairment after 17 hours of wakefulness is similar to impairment from an elevated blood alcohol level.

It has been suggested that work overload and circadian desynchronization may cause performance impairment. Those who perform shift work suffer from increased fatigue because the timing of their sleep/wake schedule is out of sync with natural daylight (see Shift work syndrome). They are more prone to auto and industrial accidents as well as a decreased quality of work and productivity on the job.

Ground crews at NASA are also affected by slam shifting (sleep shifting) while supporting critical International Space Station operations during overnight shifts.

== In space ==
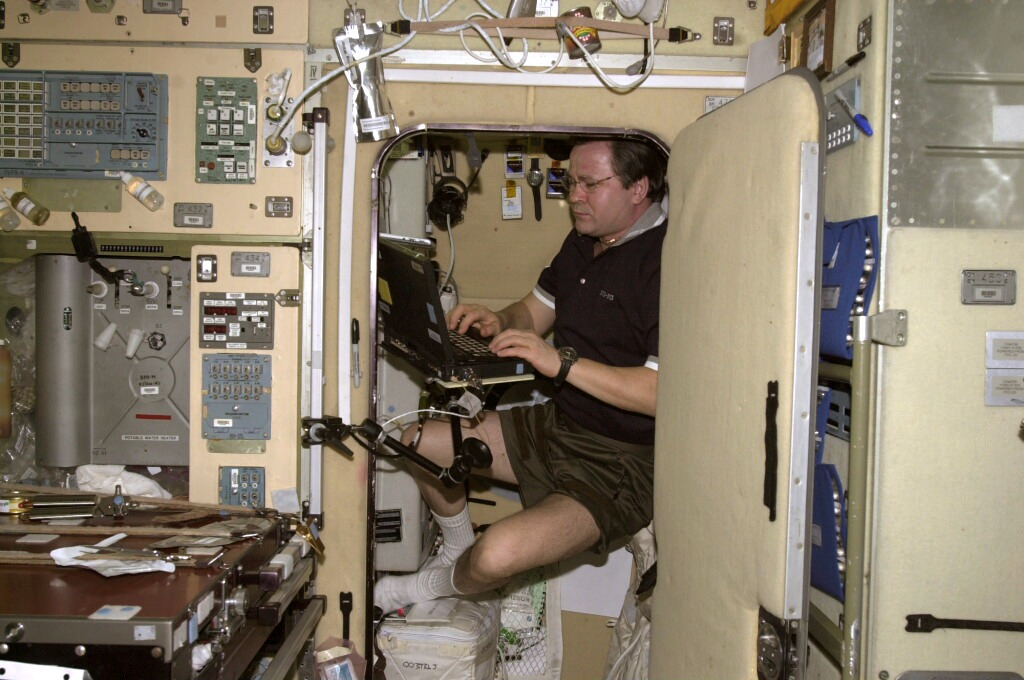
Flight engineer Nikolai Budarin uses a computer in a sleep station in the Zvezda Service Module on the International Space Station.

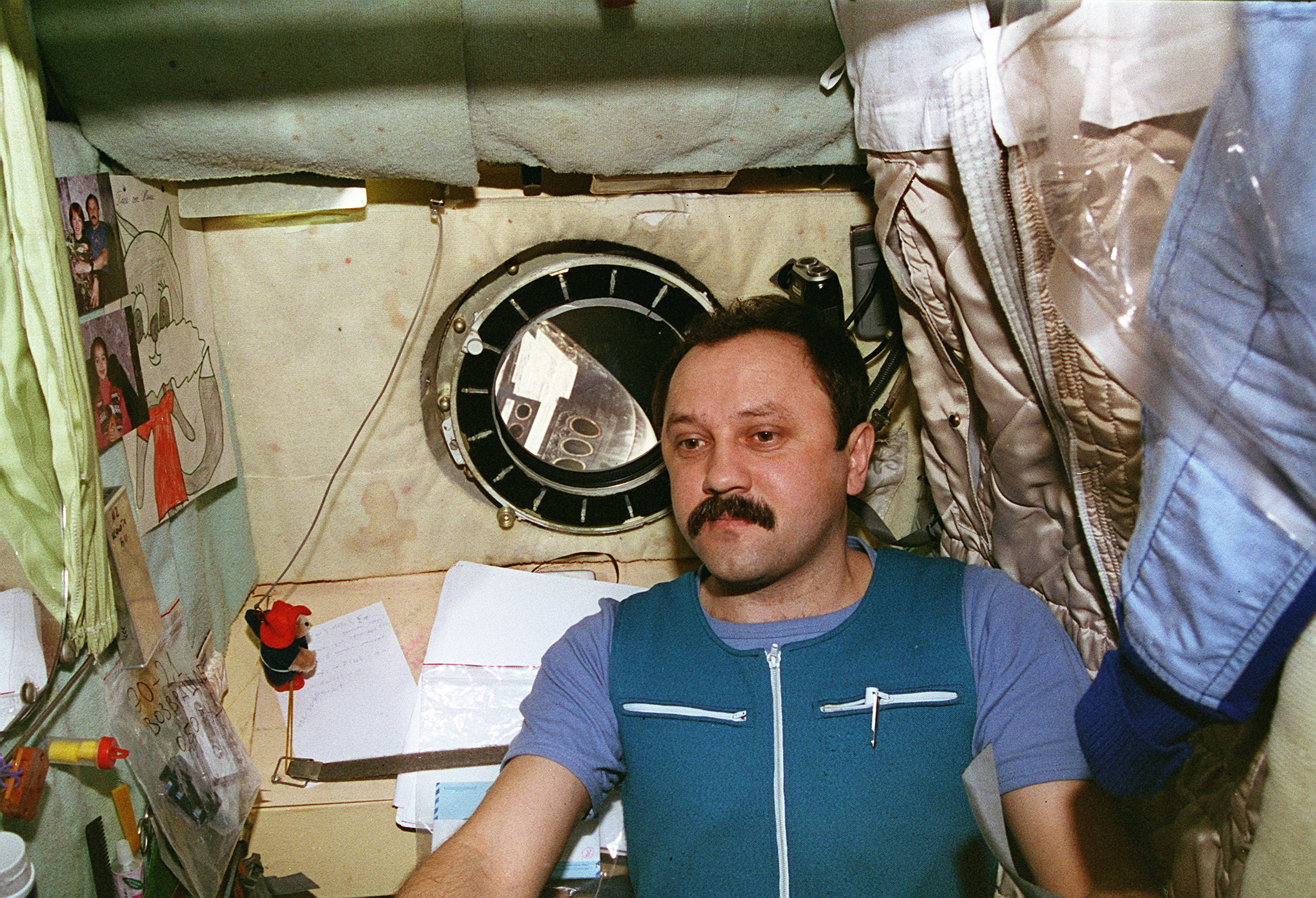
Cosmonaut Yury Usachov in his sleeping compartment on Mir, called a Kayutka

During the Apollo program, it was discovered that adequate sleep in the small volumes available in the command module and Lunar Module was most easily achieved if (1) there was minimum disruption to the pre-flight circadian rhythm of the crew members; (2) all crew members in the spacecraft slept at the same time; (3) crew members were able to doff their suits before sleeping; (4) work schedules were organized – and revised as needed – to provide an undisturbed (radio quiet) 6-8 hour rest period during each 24-hour period; (5) in zero-g, loose restraints were provided to keep the crewmen from drifting; (6) on the lunar surface, a hammock or other form of bed was provided; (7) there was an adequate combination of cabin temperature and sleepwear for comfort; (8) the crew could dim instrument lights and either cover their eyes or exclude sunlight from the cabin; and (9) equipment such as pumps were adequately muffled.

NASA management currently has limits in place to restrict the number of hours in which astronauts are to complete tasks and events. This is known as the "Fitness for Duty Standards". Space crews' current nominal number of work hours is 6.5 hours per day, and weekly work time should not exceed 48 hours. NASA defines critical workload overload for a space flight crew as 10-hour work days for 3 days per work week, or more than 60 hours per week (NASA STD-3001, Vol. 1). Astronauts have reported that periods of high-intensity workload can result in mental and physical fatigue. Studies from the medical and aviation industries have shown that increased and intense workloads combined with disturbed sleep and fatigue can lead to significant health issues and performance errors.

Research suggests that astronauts' quality and quantity of sleep while in space is markedly reduced than while on Earth. The use of sleep-inducing medication could be indicative of poor sleep due to disturbances. Current space flight data shows that accuracy, response time and recall tasks are all affected by sleep loss, work overload, fatigue and circadian desynchronization.

=== Factors that contribute to sleep loss and fatigue ===
The most common factors that can affect the length and quality of sleep while in space include:

- noise
- physical discomfort
- voids
- disturbances caused by other crew members
- temperature

An evidence gathering effort is currently underway to evaluate the impact of these individual, physiological and environmental factors on sleep and fatigue. The effects of work-rest schedules, environmental conditions and flight rules and requirements on sleep, fatigue and performance are also being evaluated.

Paul J. Weitz said that on Skylab he could not sleep vertically despite being weightless, so removed the metal frame in his sleeping bag and slept horizontally on it.

=== Factors that contribute to circadian desynchronization ===
Exposure to light is the largest contributor to circadian desynchronization on board the ISS. Since the ISS orbits the Earth every 1.5 hours, the flight crew experiences 16 sunrises and sunsets per day. Slam shifting (sleep shifting) is also a considerable external factor that causes circadian desynchronization in the current space flight environment.

Other factors that may cause circadian desynchronization in space:

- shift work
- extended work hours
- timeline changes
- slam shifting (sleep shifting)
- prolonged light of lunar day
- Mars sol on Earth
- Mars sol on Mars
- abnormal environmental cues (i.e.: unnatural light exposure)

== Sleep loss, genetics, and space ==
Both acute and chronic partial sleep loss occur frequently in space flight due to operational demands and for physiological reasons not yet entirely understood. Some astronauts are affected more than others. Earth-based research has demonstrated that sleep loss poses risks to astronaut performance, and that there are large, highly reliable individual differences in the magnitude of cognitive performance, fatigue and sleepiness, and sleep homeostatic vulnerability to acute total sleep deprivation and to chronic sleep restriction in healthy adults. The stable, trait-like (phenotypic) inter-individual differences observed in response to sleep loss point to an underlying genetic component. Indeed, data suggest that common genetic variations (polymorphisms) involved in sleep-wake, circadian, and cognitive regulation may serve as markers for prediction of inter-individual differences in sleep homeostatic and neurobehavioral vulnerability to sleep restriction in healthy adults. Identification of genetic predictors of differential vulnerability to sleep restriction will help identify astronauts most in need of fatigue countermeasures in space flight and inform medical standards for obtaining adequate sleep in space.

== Computer-based simulation information ==
Biomathematical models are being developed to instantiate the biological dynamics of sleep need and circadian timing. These models could predict astronaut performance relative to fatigue and circadian desynchronization.

== See also ==
- Mir § Sleeping in space
- Effects of sleep deprivation in space
- Effects of sleep deprivation on cognitive performance
- Shift work sleep disorder
- Skylab 4
- Sleep deprivation

== Sources ==
- http://www.asc-csa.gc.ca/eng/astronauts/living-sleeping.asp
- http://science.howstuffworks.com/sleep-in-space.htm
- http://www.theatlantic.com/technology/archive/2013/02/what-its-like-for-astronauts-to-sleep-in-space/273146/
- NASA.gov
- NASA.gov
