= Local sleep =

Neurological phenomenon

Local sleep is a neurological phenomenon where brain activity in an organism that is otherwise awake enters a state which closely resembles that of sleep. In an electroencephalogram, these patterns generally resemble NREM slow-wave sleep, and oscillate between 'on' and 'off' periods in the same way that would be expected during an actual sleeping state.

Local sleep can be induced by sustained and intense periods of activation of a particular brain region, especially when coupled with sleep deprivation (a condition colloquially called "sleep drunk"), although certain cortical regions of mice have been demonstrated to enter local sleep for very brief amounts of time without any immediate trigger. Unlike microsleep, however, these brief periods of local sleep occur while the animal is still entirely conscious and functioning, although abilities associated with the specific brain region in local sleep tend to decline substantially. For instance, local sleep in brain regions associated with movement can lead to lapses in coordination, and more generally cognitive functioning seems to be somewhat impaired by local sleep of cortical regions, with mice undergoing cortical sleep exhibiting far less awareness of their surroundings and having delayed or inappropriate reactions to stimuli.

While the function of local sleep is not definitively established, in at least one study the process has been shown to improve the performance of a task in mice. The mechanism behind this is suspected to be shared with the general mechanism driving learning and memory consolidation during sleep.

== See also ==
- Neuroscience of sleep
- Sleep and memory
