= Sleep deprivation =

Condition of not having enough sleep

- Other names: Sleeplessness, sleep insufficiency
- Specialty: Sleep medicine
- Symptoms: Fatigue, eye bags, poor memory, irritable mood, weight gain
- Complications: Car and work accidents, weight gain, cardiovascular disease
- Causes: Insomnia, sleep apnea, stimulants (caffeine, amphetamine), voluntary imposition (school, work), mood disorders
- Treatment: Cognitive behavioral therapy, caffeine (to induce alertness), hypnotics

The Centers for Disease Control and Prevention's (CDC) recommendations for the amount of sleep needed decrease with age.

Sleep deprivation, also known as sleep insufficiency or sleeplessness, is the health condition of not having adequate duration or quality of sleep to support proper alertness, performance, and health. It can be either chronic or acute and may vary widely in severity. This means it can occur over both short and long periods. Sleep is important because adequate sleep, or restful sleep, is essential for maintaining overall health, brain performance, emotional regulation, and metabolic balance. Persistent sleep insufficiency can contribute to cognitive decline, emotional instability, and biological wear that has effects similar to accelerated aging. Scientific research demonstrates that inadequate sleep produces chronic consequences for overall health, ranging from attentional lapses to long-term neurodegenerative changes.

The human body and most living organisms depend on sleep for neural recovery. All known animals sleep or exhibit some form of sleep behavior, and the importance of sleep is self-evident for humans, as nearly a third of a person's life is spent sleeping. Sleep deprivation is common, affecting about one-third of the population.

The US National Sleep Foundation recommends that adults aim for 7 hours of sleep per night. Children and teenagers require even more sleep, ranging from 8–16 hours per night. For healthy young individuals with normal sleep, the appropriate sleep duration for school-aged children is between 9 and 11 hours. Acute sleep deprivation occurs when a person sleeps less than usual or does not sleep at all for a short period, typically lasting one to two days. However, if sleeplessness persists without external factors, it may lead to chronic sleep issues. Chronic sleep deprivation occurs when a person routinely sleeps less than the amount required for proper functioning. The amount of sleep needed depends on factors such as sleep quality, age, pregnancy, and the level of sleep deprivation. Sleep deprivation is linked to various adverse health outcomes, including cognitive impairments, mood disturbances, and increased risk for chronic conditions. A meta-analysis published in Sleep Medicine Reviews indicates that individuals who experience chronic sleep deprivation are at a higher risk for developing conditions such as obesity, diabetes, and cardiovascular diseases.

Insufficient sleep has been linked to weight gain, high blood pressure, diabetes, depression, heart disease, and strokes. Sleep deprivation can also lead to high anxiety, irritability, erratic behavior, poor cognitive functioning and performance, and psychotic episodes. A chronic sleep-restricted state adversely affects the brain and cognitive function. However, in a subset of cases, sleep deprivation can paradoxically lead to increased energy and alertness; although its long-term consequences have never been evaluated, sleep deprivation has even been used as a treatment for depression.

To date, most sleep deprivation studies have focused on acute sleep deprivation, suggesting that acute sleep deprivation can cause significant damage to cognitive, emotional, and physical functions and brain mechanisms. Few studies have compared the effects of acute total sleep deprivation and chronic partial sleep restriction. A complete absence of sleep over a long period is not frequent in humans (unless they have fatal insomnia or specific issues caused by surgery); it appears that brief microsleeps cannot be avoided. Long-term total sleep deprivation has caused death in lab animals.

== Terminology ==
=== Sleep deprivation vs sleep restriction ===
Reviews differentiate between having no sleep over a short-term period, such as one night ('sleep deprivation'), and having less than required sleep over a longer period ('sleep restriction'). Sleep deprivation was seen as more impactful in the short term, but sleep restriction had similar effects over a longer period. A 2022 study found that in most cases the changes induced by chronic or acute sleep loss waxed or waned across the waking day.

=== Sleep debt ===
Sleep debt refers to a build up of lost optimum sleep. Sleep deprivation is known to be cumulative. This means that the fatigue and sleep one lost as a result of, for example, staying awake all night, would be carried over to the following day. Not getting enough sleep for a couple of days cumulatively builds up a deficiency and causes symptoms of sleep deprivation to appear. A well-rested and healthy individual will generally spend less time in the REM stage of sleep. Studies have shown an inverse relationship between time spent in the REM stage of sleep and subsequent wakefulness during waking hours. Short-term insomnia can be induced by stress or when the body experiences changes in environment and regimen.

=== Insomnia ===
Insomnia is a sleep disorder where people have difficulty falling asleep, or staying asleep for as long as desired. Insomnia may be a factor in causing sleep deprivation. There are three different types of insomnia:

- Transient insomnia – short-term sleep problems that last less than three weeks;
- Acute insomnia – sleep problems which last 1– 3 weeks;
- Chronic insomnia – sleep problems which last for at least 3 months and which happen at least 3 nights per week.

Insomnia can be caused by stress, anxiety, depression, medications, poor sleeping habits, and genetics. It can be treated with cognitive behavioral therapy or with lifestyle changes such as establishing a regular sleep schedule or changing one's bedtime routine, with or without the assistance of medications such as sedatives and antidepressants.

== Health effects ==
Main health effects of sleep deprivation

=== Cognitive and neurobehavioral effects ===
Cognitive function depends heavily on adequate sleep, particularly in the prefrontal cortex, which controls executive functions like reasoning, decision-making, and attention. In a study conducted in 2010, researchers were able to identify the declines in complex cognitive processes after just a single night of sleep deprivation. Participants displayed slower reaction times, impaired logical reasoning, and reduced cognitive flexibility. All of these dysfunctions can be attributed to diminished prefrontal activation. Neuroimaging studies also confirmed similar patterns: sleep-deprived brains show reduced glucose metabolism (the body's process for creating glucose energy in the blood) in regions critical for alertness and attentional control.

One study suggested, based on neuroimaging, that 35 hours of total sleep deprivation in healthy controls negatively affected the brain's ability to put an emotional event into the proper perspective and make a controlled, suitable response to the event.

According to the latest research, lack of sleep may cause more harm than previously thought and may lead to the permanent loss of brain cells. The negative effects of sleep deprivation on alertness and cognitive performance suggest decreases in brain activity and function. These changes primarily occur in two regions: the thalamus, a structure involved in alertness and attention, and the prefrontal cortex, a region subserving alertness, attention, and higher-order cognitive processes. Interestingly, the effects of sleep deprivation appear to be constant across "night owls" and "early birds", or different sleep chronotypes, as revealed by fMRI and graph theory.

A 2009 review found that sleep loss had a wide range of cognitive and neurobehavioral effects including unstable attention, slowing of response times, decline of memory performance, reduced learning of cognitive tasks, deterioration of performance in tasks requiring divergent thinking, perseveration with ineffective solutions, performance deterioration as task duration increases; and growing neglect of activities judged to be nonessential.

==== Attention ====
The effects of inadequate sleep extend to learning, memory, and attention. Deficits in attention and working memory are one of the most important; such lapses in mundane routines can lead to unfortunate results, from forgetting ingredients while cooking to missing a sentence while taking notes. Performing tasks that require attention appears to be correlated with the number of hours of sleep received each night, declining as a function of hours of sleep deprivation. Working memory is tested by methods such as choice-reaction time tasks. A study in 2025 found that 24 hours of sleep deprivation in healthy participants caused significant decreases in attentional processing, increased reaction times, and reduced focus. The sleep-deprived participants also exhibited difficulty switching between tasks, or disrupted cognitive flexibility, an important skill for problem-solving.

Attentional lapses also extend into more critical domains in which the consequences can be life or death; car crashes and industrial disasters can result from inattentiveness attributable to sleep deprivation. To empirically measure the magnitude of attention deficits, researchers typically employ the psychomotor vigilance task (PVT), which requires the subject to press a button in response to a light at random intervals. Failure to press the button in response to the stimulus (light) is recorded as an error, attributable to the microsleeps that occur as a product of sleep deprivation.

Crucially, individuals' subjective evaluations of their fatigue often do not predict actual performance on the PVT. While totally sleep-deprived individuals are usually aware of the degree of their impairment, lapses from chronic (lesser) sleep deprivation can build up over time so that they are equal in number and severity to the lapses occurring from total (acute) sleep deprivation. Chronically sleep-deprived people, however, continue to rate themselves considerably less impaired than totally sleep-deprived participants. Since people usually evaluate their capability on tasks like driving subjectively, their evaluations may lead them to the false conclusion that they can perform tasks that require constant attention when their abilities are in fact impaired.

==== Experimental based evidence ====
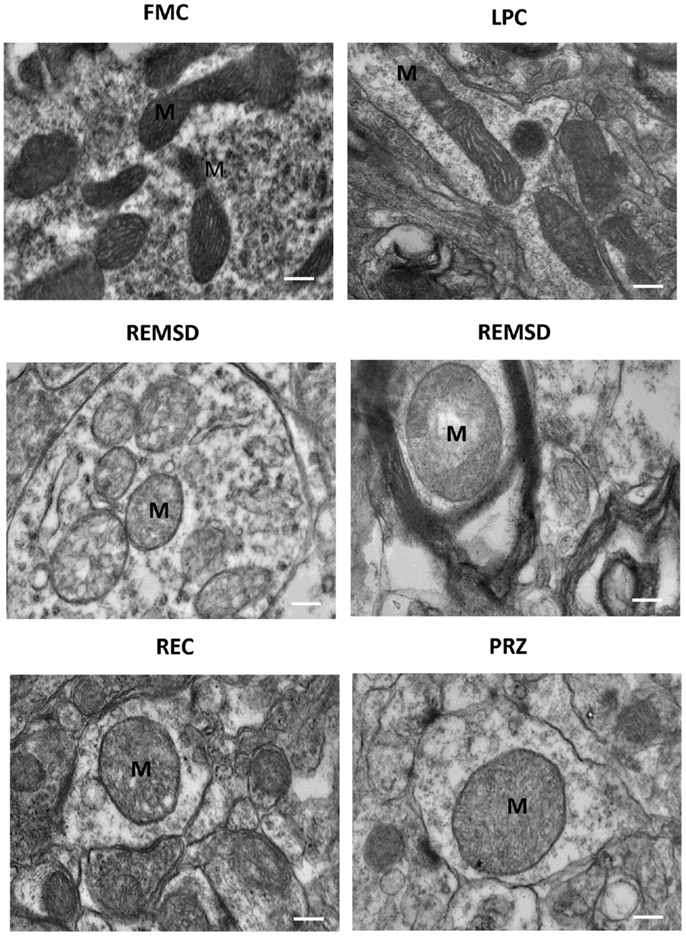
REM sleep deprivation causes swollen mitochondria in neurons (caused by cytochrome c); noradrenaline receptor blockers keep their inner cristae intact.

Studies on rodents show that the response to neuronal injury due to acute sleep deprivation is adaptative before three hours of sleep loss per night; after, it becomes maladaptative, and apoptosis occurs. Studies in mice show neuronal death (in the hippocampus, locus coeruleus, and medial PFC) occurs after two days of REM sleep deprivation. However, mice do not model the effects in humans well since they sleep a third of the duration of REM sleep of humans and caspase-3, the main effector of apoptosis, kills three times the number of cells in humans than in mice. Also not accounted for in nearly all of the studies is that acute REM sleep deprivation induces lasting (> 20 days) neuronal apoptosis in mice, and the apoptosis rate increases on the day following its end, so the amount of apoptosis is often undercounted in mice because experiments nearly always measure it the day the sleep deprivation ends. For these reasons, both the time before cells degenerate and the extent of degeneration could be greatly under evaluated in humans.

Such histological studies cannot be performed on humans for ethical reasons, but long-term studies show that sleep quality is more associated with gray matter volume reduction than age, occurring in areas like the precuneus.

The researchers aimed to investigate whether sleep deprivation would enhance impulsive behavior and hinder inhibitory control. The procedure involved having participants undergo three nights of partial sleep deprivation, followed by participation in a simulated shooting task categorized into threat and no-threat conditions. The authors employed a variety of statistical techniques, including confidence intervals, regression/mixed models, and SSRTs. A total of 52 participants were involved, with 28 in the partial sleep deprivation group and 24 in the control group. The sample size is sufficient as this number is typical for mixed model studies focused on cognitive functions. Key findings included confirming that threats elevate impulsive responses and impair inhibition, as well as finding that sleep deprivation lowers accuracy, effectively answering the research question. Additionally, they discovered that partial sleep deprivation (5 hours versus 8 hours over 3 nights) significantly decreased overall response accuracy. Limitations of the study included a lack of alternative tasks for participants to demonstrate inhibitory control, insufficient evidence for the interaction between sleep and threat, and the absence of participants from high-stakes job roles, which could have provided a more realistic context for the experiment.

=== Effects on the body ===
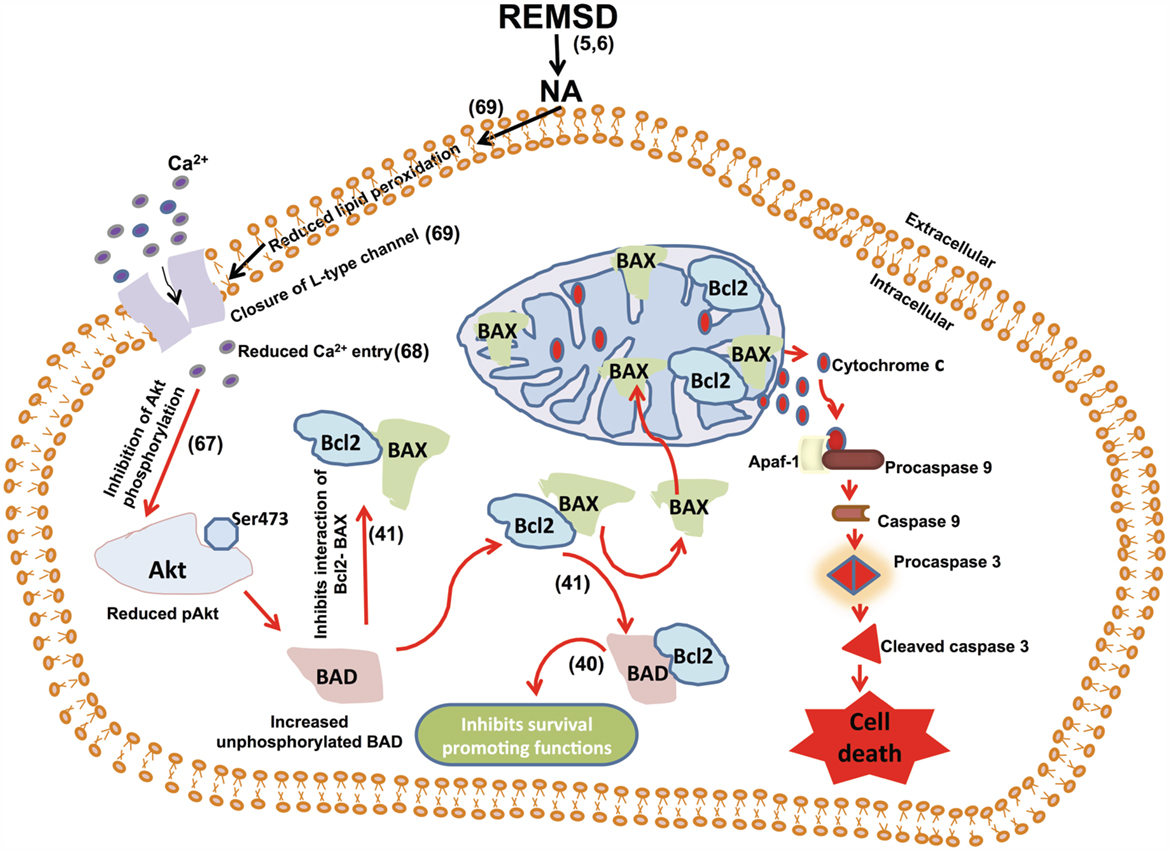
Molecular pathway of REM sleep deprivation-induced apoptosis in neurons

Sleep is necessary to repair cellular damage caused by reactive oxygen species and DNA damage. During long-term sleep deprivation, cellular damage aggregates up to a tipping point that triggers cellular degeneration and apoptosis. REM sleep deprivation causes an increase in noradrenaline (which incidentally causes the person sleep deprived to be stressed) due to the neurons in the locus coeruleus producing it not ceasing to do so, which causes an increase in the activity of the Na⁺/K⁺-ATPase pump, which itself activates the intrinsic pathway of apoptosis and prevents autophagy, which also induces the mitochondrial pathway of apoptosis.

Sleep outside of the REM phase may allow enzymes to repair brain cell damage caused by free radicals. High metabolic activity while awake damages the enzymes themselves, preventing efficient repair. This study observed the first evidence of brain damage in rats as a direct result of sleep deprivation.

==== Driving ability ====
According to a 2000 study, sleep deprivation can have some of the same hazardous effects as being intoxicated by alcohol. People who drove after being awake for 17–19 hours performed worse than those with a blood alcohol level of 0.05 percent, which is the legal limit for drunk driving in most western European countries and Australia. Another study suggested that performance begins to degrade after 16 hours awake, and 21 hours awake was equivalent to a blood alcohol content of 0.08 percent, which is the blood alcohol limit for drunk driving in Canada, the U.S., and the U.K.

The fatigue of drivers of goods trucks and passenger vehicles has come to the attention of authorities in many countries, where specific laws have been introduced with the aim of reducing the risk of traffic accidents due to driver fatigue. The right amount of sleep prepares the brain to encode added information the following day, and sleep plays a vital role in consolidating motor tasks compared to declarative memory. Rules concerning minimum break lengths, maximum shift lengths, and minimum time between shifts are common in the driving regulations used in different countries and regions, such as the drivers' working hours regulations in the European Union and hours of service regulations in the United States. The American Academy of Sleep Medicine (AASM) reports that one in every five serious motor vehicle injuries are related to driver fatigue. The National Sleep Foundation identifies several warning signs that a driver is dangerously fatigued. These include rolling down the window, turning up the radio, having trouble keeping eyes open, head-nodding, drifting out of their lane, and daydreaming. At particular risk are lone drivers between midnight and 6:00 a.m.

Sleep deprivation can negatively impact overall performance and has led to major fatal accidents. Due largely to the February 2009 crash of Colgan Air Flight 3407, which killed 50 people and was partially attributed to pilot fatigue, the FAA reviewed its procedures to ensure that pilots are sufficiently rested. Air traffic controllers were under scrutiny when, in 2010, there were 10 incidents of controllers falling asleep while on shift. The common practice of turn-around shifts caused sleep deprivation and was a contributing factor to all air traffic control incidents. The FAA reviewed its practices for shift changes, and the findings showed that controllers were not well rested. A 2004 study also found medical residents with less than four hours of sleep a night made more than twice as many errors as the 11% of surveyed residents who slept for more than seven hours a night.

==== Impacts on reasoning and decision-making ====
Twenty-four hours of continuous sleep deprivation results in the choice of less difficult math tasks without a decrease in subjective reports of effort applied to the task. Naturally occurring sleep loss affects the choice of everyday tasks, such that low-effort tasks are mostly commonly selected. Adolescents who experience less sleep show a decreased willingness to engage in sports activities that require effort through fine motor coordination and attention to detail.

Astronauts have reported performance errors and decreased cognitive ability during periods of extended working hours and wakefulness, as well as sleep loss caused by circadian rhythm disruption and environmental factors.

One study showed that individuals who were sleep deprived could make normal everyday decisions but found it difficult when evaluating long term consequences.

Recent reviews indicate that sleep loss impairs decision-making by altering underlying cognitive processes rather than simply degrading overt task performance. Computational modeling studies show that sleep deprivation reduces sensitivity to reward and punishment values while increasing decision noise, leading to more variable and less consistent choices. These cognitive changes can occur even when overall task accuracy appears preserved, suggesting that traditional behavioral measures may underestimate the impact of sleep loss on reasoning. Such findings imply that sleep deprivation disrupts the mechanisms required to evaluate options reliably, particularly in decisions involving risk, effort, and long-term consequences.

==== Working memory ====
Deficits in attention and working memory are one of the most important; such lapses in mundane routines can lead to unfortunate results. Performing tasks that require attention appears to be correlated with the number of hours of sleep received each night, declining as a function of hours of sleep deprivation. Working memory is tested by methods such as choice-reaction time tasks. Short-term patterns of chronic restricted sleep, even in short intervals (5-6 hrs a night), have been shown to result in a performance decline equivalent to two full nights of total sleep deprivation. This same study found that sleep deprivation interferes with memory formation in hippocampal long-term potentiation and thereby disrupts the acquisition of new information. This results in fragmented memory encoding and increased memory retrieval errors. This can be directly applied to school and occupational environments where pressure can cause individuals to prioritize work over sleep, compromising performance.

==== Mood and behavior ====
Sleep deprivation can have a negative impact on mood. Staying up all night or taking an unexpected night shift can make one feel irritable. Once one catches up on sleep, one's mood will often return to baseline or normal. Even partial sleep deprivation can have a significant impact on mood. In one study, subjects reported increased sleepiness, fatigue, confusion, tension, and total mood disturbance, which all recovered to their baseline after one to two full nights of sleep. Research has found that lack of sleep disrupts prefrontal inhibition of hippocampal activity, which causes memory intrusions and increased susceptibility to emotional disruptions. When applied to human behavior, we would see this in an adult or child experiencing sleep-deprivation, unable to think clearly, difficulty controlling intrusive and stress-related thoughts. Additionally, sleep deprivation also promotes impulsivity.

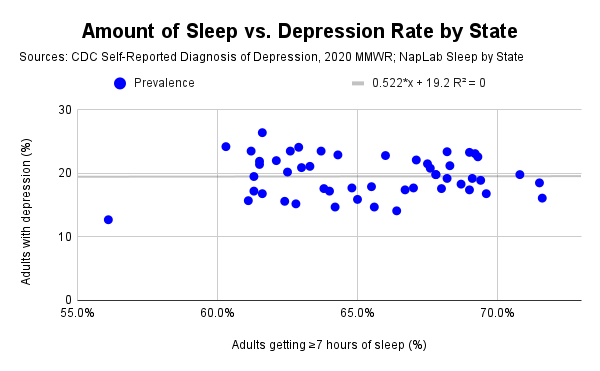
A scatter plot illustrating the prevalence of adults reporting ≥7 hours of sleep versus the prevalence of adults reporting depression, by U.S. state in 2020. The data suggests a lack of correlation between these two variables across states.

Depression and sleep are in a bidirectional relationship. Poor sleep can lead to the development of depression, and depression can cause insomnia, hypersomnia, or obstructive sleep apnea. About 75% of adult patients with depression can present with insomnia. Sleep deprivation, whether total or not, can induce significant anxiety, and longer sleep deprivations tend to result in an increased level of anxiety. Depression can also affect children in similar ways; it can lead to persistent sadness, constant irritability, and has a negative effect in the way that children perform at school. Depression can also make it hard for children to remember things.

Sleep deprivation has also shown some positive effects on mood and can be used to treat depression. Chronotype can affect how sleep deprivation influences mood. Those with morningness (advanced sleep period or "lark") preference become more depressed after sleep deprivation, while those with eveningness (delayed sleep period or "owl") preference show an improvement in mood.

Mood and mental states can affect sleep as well. Increased agitation and arousal from anxiety or stress can keep one more aroused, awake, and alert.

==== Subjective age ====
One study found that sleepiness increases the subjective sense one is old, with extreme sleepiness leading people to feel 10 years older. Other studies have also shown a correlation between relatively old subjective age and poor sleep quality.

Some animal research found that prolonged sleep deprivation can be tied to lower testosterone and reduced sperm count in males.

==== Fatigue ====
Sleep deprivation and disruption is associated with subsequent fatigue. Fatigue has different effects and characteristics from sleep deprivation.

==== Pain and recovery ====
Research shows that chronic sleep deprivation can lead to greater pain sensitivity when injuries occur as well as slow recovery. A study published in Sleep and Oxidative Stress: Current Perspectives on the Role of NRF2 showed that the factor responsible for antioxidant regulation, NRF2, is inhibited after prolonged wakefulness. An important part of the study was that oxidative damage accumulates systemically, which can have serious effects on inflammation and circadian homeostasis. Persistent exposure to oxidative stress has been associated with chronic pain disorders. The study reported that sleep deprivation amplifies the production of inflammatory cytokines, chemical messengers that help your body resist and fight germs and infections. The heightened inflammatory response driven by elevated cytokines during sleep loss is linked to systemic inflammation and increased risk of chronic illness. This is all evidence of how poor sleep contributes to somatic hypersensitivity. It also suggests that sleep is an active, restorative process rather than a passive one, during which biochemical systems engage to recalibrate redox, detoxify the natural environment, and maintain immune resistance.

==== Propensity ====
Sleep propensity can be defined as the readiness to transition from wakefulness to sleep or the ability to stay asleep if already sleeping. Sleep deprivation increases this propensity, which can be measured by polysomnography (PSG) as a reduction in sleep latency (the time needed to fall asleep). An indicator of sleep propensity can also be seen in the shortening of the transition from light stages of non-REM sleep to deeper slow-wave oscillations.

On average, the latency in healthy adults decreases by a few minutes after a night without sleep, and the latency from sleep onset to slow-wave sleep is halved. Sleep latency is generally measured with the multiple sleep latency test (MSLT). In contrast, the maintenance of wakefulness test (MWT) also uses sleep latency, but this time as a measure of the capacity of the participants to stay awake (when asked to) instead of falling asleep.

==== Impact on the sleep-wake cycle ====
Some research shows that sleep deprivation dysregulates the sleep-wake cycle. Multiple studies that identified the role of the hypothalamus and multiple neural systems controlling circadian rhythms and homeostasis have been helpful in understanding sleep deprivation better.

Some recent studies also show that sleep deprivation alters the expression of genes. These genes are responsible for regulating circadian rhythms as well as metabolism and immune function.

To describe the temporal course of the sleep-wake cycle, a two-process model of sleep regulation can be mentioned. This model proposes a homeostatic process (Process S) and a circadian process (Process C) that interact to define the time and intensity of sleep. Process S represents the drive for sleep, increasing during wakefulness and decreasing during sleep until a defined threshold level, while Process C is the oscillator responsible for these levels. When being sleep deprived, homeostatic pressure accumulates to the point that waking functions will be degraded even at the highest circadian drive for wakefulness.

=== Genetic and circadian effects ===
==== Microsleep ====
Microsleeps are periods of brief sleep that most frequently occur when a person has a significant level of sleep deprivation. Microsleeps usually last for a few seconds, usually no longer than 15 seconds, and happen most frequently when a person is trying to stay awake when they are feeling sleepy. The person usually falls into microsleep while doing a monotonous task like driving, reading a book, or staring at a computer. Microsleeps are similar to blackouts, and a person experiencing them is not consciously aware that they are occurring.

An even lighter type of sleep has been seen in rats that have been kept awake for long periods of time. In a process known as local sleep, specific localized brain regions went into periods of short (~80 ms) but frequent (~40/min) non-REM-like states. Despite the on-and-off periods where neurons shut off, the rats appeared to be awake, although they performed poorly at tests.

==== Cardiovascular morbidity ====
Decreased sleep duration is associated with many adverse cardiovascular consequences. The American Heart Association has stated that sleep restriction is a risk factor for adverse cardiometabolic profiles and outcomes. The organization recommends healthy sleep habits for ideal cardiac health, along with other well-known factors like blood pressure, cholesterol, diet, glucose, weight, smoking, and physical activity. The Centers for Disease Control and Prevention has noted that adults who sleep less than seven hours per day are more likely to have chronic health conditions, including heart attack, coronary heart disease, and stroke, compared to those with an adequate amount of sleep.

In a study that followed over 160,000 healthy, non-obese adults, the subjects who self-reported sleep duration less than six hours a day were at increased risk for developing multiple cardiometabolic risk factors. They presented with increased central obesity, elevated fasting glucose, hypertension, low high-density lipoprotein, hypertriglyceridemia, and metabolic syndrome. The presence or lack of insomnia symptoms did not modify the effects of sleep duration in this study.

The United Kingdom Biobank studied nearly 500,000 adults who had no cardiovascular disease, and the subjects who slept less than six hours a day were associated with a 20 percent increase in the risk of developing myocardial infarction (MI) over a seven-year follow-up period. Interestingly, a long sleep duration of more than nine hours a night was also a risk factor.

==== Immunosuppression ====
Among the myriad of health consequences that sleep deprivation can cause, disruption of the immune system is one of them. While it is not clearly understood, researchers believe that sleep is essential to providing sufficient energy for the immune system to work and allowing inflammation to take place during sleep. Also, just as sleep can reinforce memory in a person's brain, it can help consolidate the memory of the immune system, or adaptive immunity.

Sleep quality is directly related to immunity levels. The team, led by Professor Cohen of Carnegie Mellon University in the United States, found that even a slight disturbance of sleep may affect the body's response to the cold virus. Those with better sleep quality had significantly higher blood T and B lymphocytes than those with poor sleep quality. These two lymphocytes are the main body of immune function in the human body.

Research by Prather and colleagues at the University of California examined sleep habits and their influence on the body's response to the flu vaccine. After taking the vaccination, the study showed that those who experienced poorer sleep quality produced significantly less antibodies. In order for the immune system to fight off infection, good sleep quality is needed in order for these antibodies to work at their fullest capacity. This notion supports the claim that sleep is essential for healthy immunity levels.

An adequate amount of sleep improves the effects of vaccines that utilize adaptive immunity. When vaccines expose the body to a weakened or deactivated antigen, the body initiates an immune response. The immune system learns to recognize that antigen and attacks it when exposed again in the future. Studies have found that people who don't sleep the night after getting a vaccine are less likely to develop a proper immune response to the vaccine and sometimes even require a second dose. People who are sleep deprived in general also do not provide their bodies with sufficient time for an adequate immunological memory to form and, thus, can fail to benefit from vaccination.

People who sleep less than six hours a night are more susceptible to infection and are more likely to catch a cold or flu. A lack of sleep can also prolong the recovery time of patients that have been hospitalized.

==== Weight gain ====
A lack of sleep can cause an imbalance in several hormones that are critical for weight gain. Sleep deprivation increases the level of ghrelin (hunger hormone) and decreases the level of leptin (fullness hormone), resulting in an increased feeling of hunger and a desire for high-calorie foods. Sleep loss is also associated with decreased growth hormone and elevated cortisol levels, which are connected to obesity. People who do not get sufficient sleep can also feel sleepy and fatigued during the day and get less exercise. Obesity can cause poor sleep quality as well. Individuals who are overweight or obese can experience obstructive sleep apnea, gastroesophageal reflux disease (GERD), depression, asthma, and osteoarthritis, all of which can disrupt a good night's sleep.

In rats, prolonged, complete sleep deprivation increased both food intake and energy expenditure, with a net effect of weight loss and ultimately death. This study hypothesizes that the moderate chronic sleep debt associated with habitual short sleep is associated with increased appetite and energy expenditure, with the equation tipped towards food intake rather than expenditure in societies where high-calorie food is freely available.

==== Type 2 diabetes ====
It has been suggested that people experiencing short-term sleep restrictions process glucose more slowly than individuals receiving a full 8 hours of sleep, increasing the likelihood of developing type 2 diabetes. Poor sleep quality is linked to high blood sugar levels in diabetic and prediabetic patients, but the causal relationship is not clearly understood. Researchers suspect that sleep deprivation affects insulin, cortisol, and oxidative stress, which subsequently influence blood sugar levels. Sleep deprivation can increase the level of ghrelin and decrease the level of leptin. People who get insufficient amounts of sleep are more likely to crave food in order to compensate for the lack of energy. This habit can raise blood sugar and put them at risk of obesity and diabetes.

In 2005, a study of over 1400 participants showed that participants who habitually slept fewer hours were more likely to have associations with type 2 diabetes. However, because this study was merely correlational, the direction of cause and effect between little sleep and diabetes is uncertain. The authors point to an earlier study that showed that experimental rather than habitual restriction of sleep resulted in impaired glucose tolerance (IGT).

==== Other effects ====
Sleep deprivation may facilitate or intensify:

- aching muscles
- confusion, memory lapses or loss
- depression
- development of false memory
- hypnagogic and hypnopompic hallucinations during falling asleep and waking, which are entirely normal
- hand tremor
- headaches
- malaise
- stye
- periorbital puffiness, commonly known as "bags under eyes" or eye bags
- increased blood pressure
- increased stress hormone levels
- increased risk of type 2 diabetes
- lowering of immunity, increased susceptibility to illness
- increased risk of fibromyalgia
- irritability
- nystagmus (rapid involuntary rhythmic eye movement)
- obesity
- seizures
- mania
- Sleep inertia
- tachycardia risk. One study found that a single night of sleep deprivation may cause tachycardia, a condition in which the heart rate exceeds 100 beats per minute (in the following day).
- temper tantrums in children
- violent behavior
- yawning

Sleep deprivation may cause symptoms similar to:

- attention-deficit hyperactivity disorder (ADHD)
- psychosis

=== Positive effects ===
==== Increased energy and alertness in some cases ====
In a subset of cases, sleep deprivation can paradoxically lead to increased energy and alertness.

== Causes ==
Modern society has redefined sleep as expendable. Population data indicate that sleep deprivation is widespread, affecting significant proportions of students, workers, and the elderly worldwide. Studies among students and healthcare workers document chronic patterns of sleep deprivation connected to academic pressure and shift-based labor demands. A 2025 study conducted by the University of South Florida reported that college students average 5.8 hours of sleep per night, leading to measurable and significant decreases in memory recall, focus, and emotional resilience. This "sleep culture" overlooks the brain and body's critical restorative needs. Societal expectations combined with environmental disruptions foster a chronic misalignment between biological clocks and social schedules, further intensifying the detrimental effects of sleep loss.

People aged 18 to 64 need seven to nine hours of sleep per night. Sleep deprivation occurs when this is not achieved. Causes of this can be as follows:

=== Environmental factors ===
Environmental factors significantly influence sleep quality and can contribute to sleep deprivation in various ways. Noise pollution from traffic, construction, and loud neighbors can disrupt sleep by causing awakenings and preventing deeper sleep stages. Similarly, light exposure, particularly from artificial sources like screens, interferes with the body's natural circadian rhythms by suppressing melatonin production, making it challenging to fall asleep. Air quality, odours and temperatures can all affect sleep quality and duration as well.

To mitigate the effects of these environmental influences, individuals can consider strategies, such as using soundproofing measures, installing blackout curtains, adjusting room temperatures, investing in comfortable bedding, and improving air quality with purifiers. By addressing these environmental factors, individuals can enhance their sleep hygiene and overall health.

=== Insomnia ===
Insomnia, one of the six types of dyssomnia, affects 21–37% of the adult population. Many of its symptoms are easily recognizable, including excessive daytime sleepiness; frustration or worry about sleep; problems with attention, concentration, or memory; extreme mood changes or irritability; lack of energy or motivation; poor performance at school or work; and tension headaches or stomach aches.

Insomnia can be grouped into primary and secondary, or comorbid, insomnia.

Primary insomnia is a sleep disorder not attributable to a medical, psychiatric, or environmental cause. There are three main types of primary insomnia. These include psychophysiological, idiopathic insomnia, and sleep state misperception (paradoxical insomnia). Psychophysiological insomnia is anxiety-induced. Idiopathic insomnia generally begins in childhood and lasts for the rest of a person's life. It's suggested that idiopathic insomnia is a neurochemical problem in a part of the brain that controls the sleep-wake cycle, resulting in either under-active sleep signals or over-active wake signals. Sleep state misperception is diagnosed when people get enough sleep but inaccurately perceive that their sleep is insufficient.

Secondary insomnia, or comorbid insomnia, occurs concurrently with other medical, neurological, psychological, and psychiatric conditions. Causation is not necessarily implied. Causes can be from depression, anxiety, and personality disorders.

=== Sleep apnea ===
Sleep apnea is a serious disorder that has symptoms of both insomnia and sleep deprivation, among other symptoms like excessive daytime sleepiness, abrupt awakenings, and difficulty concentrating. It is a sleep related breathing disorder that can cause partial or complete obstruction of the upper airways during sleep. One billion people worldwide are affected by obstructive sleep apnea. Those with sleep apnea may experience symptoms such as awakening gasping or choking, restless sleep, morning headaches, morning confusion or irritability, and restlessness. This disorder affects 1 to 10 percent of Americans. It has many serious health outcomes if left untreated. Positive airway pressure therapy using CPAP (continuous positive airway pressure), APAP, or BPAP devices is considered the first-line treatment option for sleep apnea.

Central sleep apnea is caused by a failure of the central nervous system to signal the body to breathe during sleep. Treatments similar to obstructive sleep apnea may be used, as well as other treatments such as adaptive servo ventilation and certain medications. Some medications, such as opioids, may contribute to or cause central sleep apnea.

=== Self-imposed ===
Sleep deprivation can sometimes be self-imposed due to a lack of desire to sleep or the habitual use of stimulant drugs. Bedtime procrastination is a need to stay up late after a busy day to feel like the day is longer, leading to sleep deprivation.

==== Caffeine ====
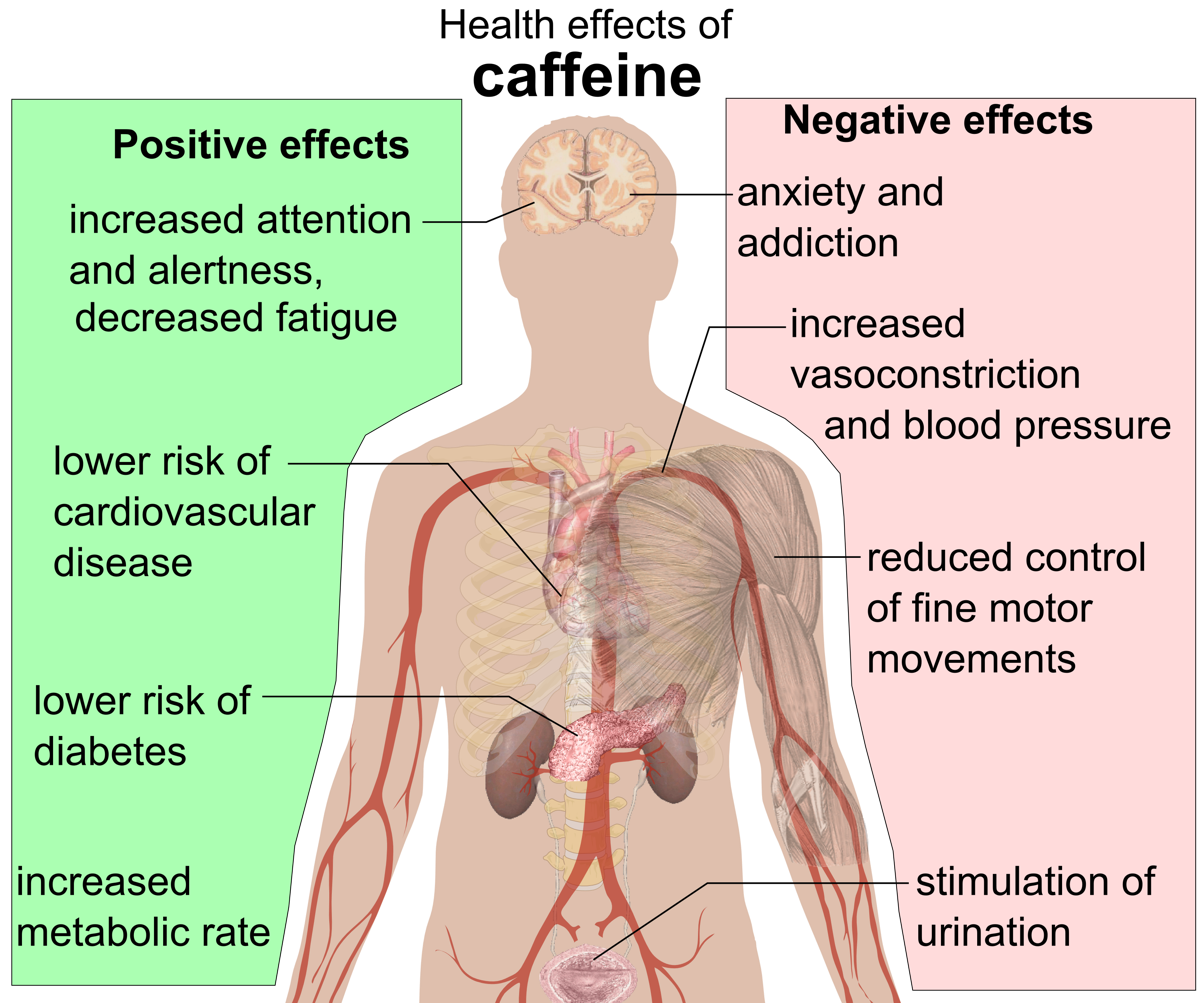
This diagram shows how caffeine affects the different areas of the body, both positively and negatively.

Consumption of caffeine in large quantities can have negative effects on one's sleep cycle.

Caffeine consumption, usually in the form of coffee, is one of the most widely used stimulants in the world. While there are short-term performance benefits to caffeine consumption, overuse can lead to insomnia symptoms or worsen pre-existing insomnia. Consuming caffeine to stay awake at night may lead to sleeplessness, anxiety, frequent nighttime awakenings, and overall poorer sleep quality. The main metabolite of melatonin (6-sulfatoxymelatonin) gets reduced with consumption of caffeine in the day, which is one of the mechanisms by which sleep is interrupted.

A study conducted in 2025 used fruit flies as a model to evaluate how caffeine interacts with sleep deprivation and found that although caffeine increased arousal and stimulation responses, it also reduced lifespan after 20-24 hrs of sleeplessness.

In human studies, caffeine temporarily restores alertness by activating adenosine receptors that would have typically decreased after initial stages of sleep deprivation, contracting the brain's "sleep pressure." This interference disrupts sleep structure once caffeine is metabolized in the body. A study showed that caffeine use after sleep deprivation reduces REM deep sleep by 20-40%. This damage impairs the restorative processes necessary for memory and metabolic repair. Similarly, another study found when caffeine is consumed up to 6 hours before bedtime, total sleep is reduced by one hour and efficiency by 10%.

==== Studying ====
The U.S. National Sleep Foundation cites a 1996 paper showing that college/university-aged students get an average of less than 6 hours of sleep each night. A 2018 study highlights the need for a good night's sleep for students, finding that college students who averaged eight hours of sleep for the five nights of finals week scored higher on their final exams than those who did not.

In the study, 70.6% of students reported obtaining less than 8 hours of sleep, and up to 27% of students may be at risk for at least one sleep disorder. Sleep deprivation is common in first-year college students as they adjust to the stress and social activities of college life.

Sleep deprivation is a well-known problem that happens among college students. Many causes for this issue are discussed in a way to prevent or at least, to decrease the rate of sleep issues. According to Dunietz, the moment when a young adult starts college can be a challenge due to change in daily routine, different demands (socially and academically) and all of that can bring a lot of stress. Mental health is also a concern when talking about sleep disorder. In this topic, depression and Attention-Deficit/Hyperactivity Disorder (ADHD) can play a two-way role affecting the sleep quality, and also getting worse with a bad sleep, creating a dangerous cycle for college students (Mbous et al.).

Estevan et al. studied the relationships between sleep and test performance. They found that students tend to sleep less than usual the night before an exam and that exam performance was positively correlated with sleep duration.

A study performed by the Department of Psychology at the National Chung Cheng University in Taiwan concluded that freshmen received the least amount of sleep during the week.

Studies of later start times in schools have consistently reported benefits to adolescent sleep, health, and learning using a wide variety of methodological approaches. In contrast, there are no studies showing that early start times have any positive impact on sleep, health, or learning. Data from international studies demonstrate that "synchronized" start times for adolescents are far later than the start times in the overwhelming majority of educational institutions. In 1997, University of Minnesota researchers compared students who started school at 7:15 a.m. with those who started at 8:40 a.m. They found that students who started at 8:40 got higher grades and more sleep on weekday nights than those who started earlier. One in four U.S. high school students admits to falling asleep in class at least once a week.

It is known that during human adolescence, circadian rhythms and, therefore, sleep patterns typically undergo marked changes. Electroencephalogram (EEG) studies indicate a 50% reduction in deep (stage 4) sleep and a 75% reduction in the peak amplitude of delta waves during NREM sleep in adolescence. School schedules are often incompatible with a corresponding delay in sleep offset, leading to a less than optimal amount of sleep for the majority of adolescents.

=== Mental illness ===
Chronic sleep problems affect 50% to 80% of patients in a typical psychiatric practice, compared with 10% to 18% of adults in the general U.S. population. Sleep problems are particularly common in patients with anxiety, depression, bipolar disorder, and attention deficit hyperactivity disorder (ADHD).

The specific causal relationships between sleep loss and effects on psychiatric disorders have been most extensively studied in patients with mood disorders. Shifts into mania in bipolar patients are often preceded by periods of insomnia, and sleep deprivation has been shown to induce a manic state in about 30% of patients. Sleep deprivation may represent a final common pathway in the genesis of mania, and manic patients usually have a continuous reduced need for sleep.

The symptoms of sleep deprivation and those of schizophrenia are parallel, including those of positive and cognitive symptoms.

=== Hospital stay ===
A study performed nationwide in the Netherlands found that general ward patients staying at the hospital experienced shorter total sleep (83 min. less), more night-time awakenings, and earlier awakenings compared to sleeping at home. Over 70% experienced being woken up by external causes, such as hospital staff (35.8%). Sleep-disturbing factors included the noise of other patients, medical devices, pain, and toilet visits. Sleep deprivation is even more severe in ICU patients, where the naturally occurring nocturnal peak of melatonin secretion was found to be absent, possibly causing the disruption in the normal sleep-wake cycle. However, as the personal characteristics and the clinical picture of hospital patients are so diverse, the possible solutions to improve sleep and circadian rhythmicity should be tailored to the individual and within the possibilities of the hospital ward. Multiple interventions could be considered to aid patient characteristics, improve hospital routines, or improve the hospital environment.

=== Time online ===
Modern technological factors exacerbate global sleep deficits. Exposure to artificial blue light from screens suppresses melatonin production, disrupts circadian rhythms, and delays sleep onset. The increased use of social media and mobile devices often extends wakefulness beyond biological needs, most prevalent among adolescents and young adults. A 2018 study published in the Journal of Economic Behavior and Organization found that broadband internet connection was associated with sleep deprivation. The study concluded that people with a broadband connection tend to sleep 25 minutes less than those without a broadband connection; hence, they are less likely to get the scientifically recommended 7–9 hours of sleep. Another study conducted on 435 non-medical staff at King Saud University Medical City reported that 9 out of 10 of the respondents used their smartphones at bedtime, with social media being the most used service (80.5%). The study found participants who spent more than 60 minutes using their smartphones at bedtime were 7.4 times more likely to have poor sleep quality than participants who spent less than 15 minutes. Overall, internet usage an hour before bedtime has been found to disrupt sleeping patterns. Social media engagement also contributes to sleep loss because it increases cognitive and emotional arousal, keeping the brain mentally alert instead of winding down before bed. Along with the mental alertness screentime usage at night also caused less rest time, reduced sleep quality, and an increase in daytime fatigue. This effect is shown across multiple age groups, which leads to a big factor in modern sleep deprivation.

=== Shift work ===
Many businesses are operational 24/7, such as airlines, hospitals, etc., where workers perform their duties in different shifts. Shift work patterns cause sleep deprivation and lead to poor concentration, detrimental health effects, and fatigue. Shift work can disrupt the normal circadian rhythms of biologic functions, which is associated with the sleep/wake cycle. Both the sleep length and quality can be affected. A "shift-work sleep disorder" has been diagnosed in approximately 10% of shift workers aged between 18–65 years old according to the International Classification of Sleep Disorders, version 2 (ICSD-2). Shift work remains an unspoken challenge within industries, often disregarded by both employers and employees alike, leading to an increase in occupational injuries. A worker experiencing fatigue poses a potential danger, not only to themselves, but also to others around them. Both employers and employees must acknowledge the risks associated with sleep deprivation and on-the-job fatigue to effectively mitigate the chances of occupational injuries.

== Treatments and prevention ==
Although there are numerous causes of sleep deprivation, there are some fundamental measures that promote quality sleep, as suggested by organizations such as the Centers for Disease Control and Prevention, the National Institute of Health, the National Institute of Aging, and the American Academy of Family Physicians.

=== Sleep hygiene ===
Historically, sleep hygiene, as first medically defined by Hauri in 1977, was the standard for promoting healthy sleep habits, but evidence that has emerged since the 2010s suggests they are ineffective, both for people with insomnia and for people without.

Sleep hygiene recommendations include:

- setting a fixed sleep schedule
- taking naps with caution
- maintaining a sleep environment that promotes sleep (cool temperature, limited exposure to light and noise)
- comfortable mattresses and pillows
- exercising daily
- avoiding alcohol, nicotine and caffeine
- avoiding heavy meals in the evening
- winding down and avoiding electronic use or physical activities close to bedtime
- getting out of bed if unable to fall asleep.

=== CBT ===
For long-term involuntary sleep deprivation, cognitive behavioral therapy for insomnia (CBT-i) is recommended as a first-line treatment after the exclusion of a physical diagnosis (e.g., sleep apnea).

CBT-i contains five different components:

- cognitive therapy
- stimulus control
- sleep restriction
- sleep hygiene
- relaxation.

As this approach has minimal adverse effects and long-term benefits, it is often preferred to (chronic) drug therapy.

=== Assessments ===
Patients with sleep deprivation may present with complaints of symptoms and signs of insufficient sleep, such as fatigue, sleepiness, drowsy driving, and cognitive difficulties. Sleep insufficiency can easily go unrecognized and undiagnosed unless patients are specifically asked about it by their clinicians.

Several questions are critical in evaluating sleep duration and quality, as well as the cause of sleep deprivation. Sleep patterns (typical bed time or rise time on weekdays and weekends), shift work, and frequency of naps can reveal the direct cause of poor sleep, and quality of sleep should be discussed to rule out any diseases such as obstructive sleep apnea and restless leg syndrome.

=== Sleep diaries ===
Sleep diaries are useful in providing detailed information about sleep patterns. They are inexpensive, readily available, and easy to use. The diaries can be as simple as a 24-hour log to note the time of being asleep or can be detailed to include other relevant information.

=== Sleep questionnaires ===
Sleep questionnaires such as the Sleep Timing Questionnaire (STQ) and Tayside children's sleep questionnaire can be used instead of sleep diaries if there is any concern for patient adherence.

Sleep quality can be assessed using the Pittsburgh Sleep Quality Index (PSQI), a self-report questionnaire designed to measure sleep quality and disturbances over a one-month period.

=== Measures to increase alertness ===
There are several strategies that help increase alertness and counteract the effects of sleep deprivation.

- Caffeine is often used over short periods to boost wakefulness when acute sleep deprivation is experienced; however, caffeine is less effective if taken routinely.

Other strategies recommended by the American Academy of Sleep Medicine include

- prophylactic sleep before deprivation
- naps
- other stimulants

and combinations thereof.

The American Academy of Sleep Medicine has said that the only sure and safe way to combat sleep deprivation is to increase nightly sleep time.

=== Actigraphy ===
Actigraphy is a useful, objective wrist-worn tool if the validity of self-reported sleep diaries or questionnaires is questionable. Actigraphy works by recording movements and using computerized algorithms to estimate total sleep time, sleep onset latency, the amount of wake after sleep onset, and sleep efficiency. Some devices have light sensors to detect light exposure.

=== Wearable devices ===
Wearable devices such as Fitbits and Apple Watches monitor various body signals, including heart rate, skin temperature, and movement, to provide information about sleep patterns. They operate continuously, collecting extensive data which can be used to offer insights on sleep improvement. These devices are user-friendly and have increased awareness about the significance of quality sleep for health.

== Medical uses ==
=== Treating depression ===
Studies show that sleep restriction has some potential for treating depression. Those with depression tend to have earlier occurrences of REM sleep with an increased number of rapid eye movements; therefore, monitoring patients' EEG and awakening them during occurrences of REM sleep appear to have a therapeutic effect, alleviating depressive symptoms. This kind of treatment is known as wake therapy. Although as many as 60% of patients show an immediate recovery when sleep-deprived, most patients relapse the following night. The effect has been shown to be linked to an increase in brain-derived neurotrophic factor (BDNF). A comprehensive evaluation of the human metabolome in sleep deprivation in 2014 found that 27 metabolites are increased after 24 waking hours and suggested serotonin, tryptophan, and taurine may contribute to the antidepressant effect.

The incidence of relapse can be decreased by combining sleep deprivation with medication or a combination of light therapy and phase advance (going to bed substantially earlier than one's normal time). Many tricyclic antidepressants suppress REM sleep, providing additional evidence for a link between mood and sleep. Similarly, tranylcypromine has been shown to completely suppress REM sleep at adequate doses.

=== Treating insomnia ===
Sleep deprivation can be implemented for a short period of time in the treatment of insomnia. Some common sleep disorders have been shown to respond to cognitive behavioral therapy for insomnia. Cognitive behavioral therapy for insomnia is a multicomponent process that is composed of stimulus control therapy, sleep restriction therapy (SRT), and sleep hygiene therapy. One of the components is a controlled regime of "sleep restriction" in order to restore the homeostatic drive to sleep and encourage normal "sleep efficiency". Stimulus control therapy is intended to limit behaviors intended to condition the body to sleep while in bed. The main goal of stimulus control and sleep restriction therapy is to create an association between bed and sleep. Although sleep restriction therapy shows efficacy when applied as an element of cognitive-behavioral therapy, its efficacy is yet to be proven when used alone. Sleep hygiene therapy is intended to help patients develop and maintain good sleeping habits. Sleep hygiene therapy is not helpful, however, when used as a mono-therapy without the pairing of stimulus control therapy and sleep restriction therapy. Light stimulation affects the supraoptic nucleus of the hypothalamus, controlling circadian rhythm and inhibiting the secretion of melatonin from the pineal gland. Light therapy can improve sleep quality, improve sleep efficiency, and extend sleep duration by helping to establish and consolidate regular sleep-wake cycles. Light therapy is a natural, simple, low-cost treatment that does not lead to residual effects or tolerance. Adverse reactions include headaches, eye fatigue, and even mania.

In addition to the cognitive behavioral treatment of insomnia, there are also generally four approaches to treating insomnia medically. These are through the use of barbiturates, benzodiazepines, and benzodiazepine receptor agonists. Barbiturates are not considered to be a primary source of treatment due to the fact that they have a low therapeutic index, while melatonin agonists are shown to have a higher therapeutic index.

== Additional uses ==
=== Military use and training ===
Sleep deprivation has become hardwired into the military culture. It is prevalent in the entire force and especially severe for service members deployed in high-conflict environments.

Sleep deprivation has been used by the military in training programs to prepare personnel for combat experiences when proper sleep schedules are not realistic. Sleep deprivation is used to create a different schedule pattern that is beyond a typical 24-hour day. Sleep deprivation is pivotal in training games such as "Keep in Memory" exercises, where personnel practice memorizing everything they can while under intense stress physically and mentally and being able to describe in as much detail as they can remember of what they remember seeing days later. Sleep deprivation is used in training to create soldiers who are used to only going off of a few hours or minutes of sleep randomly when available.

DARPA initiated sleep research to create a highly resilient soldier capable of sustaining extremely prolonged wakefulness, inspired by the white-crowned sparrow's week-long sleeplessness during migration, at a time when it was not understood that migration birds actually slept with half of their brain. This pursuit aimed both to produce a "super soldier" able "to go for a minimum of seven days without sleep, and in the longer term perhaps at least double that time frame, while preserving high levels of mental and physical performance", and to enhance productivity in sleep-deprived personnel. Military experiments on sleep have been conducted on combatants and prisoners, such as those in Guantánamo, where controlled lighting is combined with torture techniques to manipulate sensory experiences. Crary highlights how constant illumination and the removal of day-night distinctions create what he defines as a "time of indifference," utilizing light management as a form of psychological control.

However, studies have since evaluated the impact of the sleep deprivation imprint on the military culture. Personnel surveys reveal common challenges such as inadequate sleep, fatigue, and impaired daytime functioning, impacting operational effectiveness and post-deployment reintegration. These sleep issues elevate the risk of severe mental health disorders, including PTSD and depression. Early intervention is crucial. Though promising, implementing cognitive-behavioral and imagery-rehearsal therapies for insomnia remains a challenge. Several high-profile military accidents caused in part or fully by sleep deprivation of personnel have been documented. The military has prioritized sleep education, with recent Army guidelines equating sleep importance to nutrition and exercise. The Navy, particularly influenced by retired Captain John Cordle, has actively experimented with watch schedules to align shipboard life with sailors' circadian needs, leading to improved sleep patterns, especially in submarines, supported by ongoing research efforts at the Naval Postgraduate School. Watch schedules with longer and more reliable resting intervals are nowadays the norm on U.S. submarines and a recommended option for surface ships.

In addition to sleep deprivation, circadian misalignment, as commonly experienced by submarine crews, causes several long-term health issues and a decrease in cognitive performance.

==== To facilitate abusive control ====
Sleep deprivation can be used to disorient abuse victims to help set them up for abusive control.

==== Interrogation ====
Sleep deprivation can be used as a means of interrogation, which has resulted in court trials over whether or not the technique is a form of torture.

Under one interrogation technique, a subject might be kept awake for several days and, when finally allowed to fall asleep, suddenly awakened and questioned. Menachem Begin, the Prime Minister of Israel from 1977 to 1983, described his experience of sleep deprivation as a prisoner of the NKVD in the Soviet Union as follows:

In the head of the interrogated prisoner, a haze begins to form. His spirit is wearied to death, his legs are unsteady, and he has one sole desire: to sleep... Anyone who has experienced this desire knows that not even hunger and thirst are comparable with it.

Sleep deprivation was one of the five techniques used by the British government in the 1970s. The European Court of Human Rights ruled in 1978 that the five techniques "did not occasion suffering of the particular intensity and cruelty implied by the word torture ... [but] amounted to a practice of inhuman and degrading treatment", in breach of the European Convention on Human Rights.

The United States Justice Department released four memos in August 2002 describing interrogation techniques used by the Central Intelligence Agency. They first described 10 techniques used in the interrogation of Abu Zubaydah, described as a terrorist logistics specialist, including sleep deprivation. Memos signed by Steven G. Bradbury in May 2005 claimed that forced sleep deprivation for up to 180 hours (7 1/2 days) by shackling a diapered prisoner to the ceiling did not constitute torture, nor did the combination of multiple interrogation methods (including sleep deprivation) constitute torture under United States law. These memoranda were repudiated and withdrawn during the first months of the Obama administration.

The question of the extreme use of sleep deprivation as torture has advocates on both sides of the issue. In 2006, Australian Federal Attorney-General Philip Ruddock argued that sleep deprivation does not constitute torture. Nicole Bieske, a spokeswoman for Amnesty International Australia, has stated the opinion of her organization as follows: "At the very least, sleep deprivation is cruel, inhumane and degrading. If used for prolonged periods of time it is torture."

== By region ==
=== In the U.S. ===
National Geographic Magazine has reported that the demands of work, social activities, and the availability of 24-hour home entertainment and Internet access have caused people to sleep less now than in premodern times. USA Today reported in 2007 that most adults in the USA get about an hour less than the average sleep time 40 years ago.

Other researchers have questioned these claims. A 2004 editorial in the journal Sleep stated that, according to the available data, the average number of hours of sleep in a 24-hour period has not changed significantly in recent decades among adults. Furthermore, the editorial suggests that there is a range of normal sleep time required by healthy adults, and many indicators used to suggest chronic sleepiness among the population as a whole do not stand up to scientific scrutiny.

A comparison of data collected from the Bureau of Labor Statistics' American Time Use Survey from 1965 to 1985 and 1998–2001 has been used to show that the median amount of sleep, napping, and resting done by the average adult American has changed by less than 0.7%, from a median of 482 minutes per day from 1965 through 1985 to 479 minutes per day from 1998 through 2001.

== Longest periods without sleep ==
Randy Gardner holds the scientifically documented record for the longest period of time a human being has intentionally gone without sleep not using stimulants of any kind. Gardner stayed awake for 264 hours (11 days), breaking the previous record of 260 hours held by Tom Rounds of Honolulu. Lieutenant Commander John J. Ross of the U.S. Navy Medical Neuropsychiatric Research Unit later published an account of this event, which became well known among sleep-deprivation researchers.

The Guinness World Record stands at 449 hours (18 days, 17 hours), held by Maureen Weston of Peterborough, Cambridgeshire, in April 1977, in a rocking-chair marathon.

Claims of total sleep deprivation lasting years have been made several times, but none are scientifically verified. Claims of partial sleep deprivation are better documented. For example, Rhett Lamb of St. Petersburg, Florida, was initially reported to not sleep at all but actually had a rare condition permitting him to sleep only one to two hours per day in the first three years of his life. He had a rare abnormality called an Arnold–Chiari malformation, where brain tissue protrudes into the spinal canal and the skull puts pressure on the protruding part of the brain. The boy was operated on at All Children's Hospital in St. Petersburg in May 2008. Two days after surgery, he slept through the night.

French sleep expert Michel Jouvet and his team reported the case of a patient who was quasi-sleep-deprived for four months, as confirmed by repeated polygraphic recordings showing less than 30 minutes (of stage-1 sleep) per night, a condition they named "agrypnia". The 27-year-old man had Morvan's fibrillary chorea, a rare disease that leads to involuntary movements, and in this particular case, extreme insomnia. The researchers found that treatment with 5-HTP restored almost normal sleep stages. However, some months after this recovery, the patient died during a relapse that was unresponsive to 5-HTP. The cause of death was pulmonary edema. Despite the extreme insomnia, psychological investigation showed no sign of cognitive deficits, except for some hallucinations.

Fatal insomnia is a neurodegenerative disease that eventually results in a complete inability to go past stage 1 of NREM sleep. In addition to insomnia, patients may experience panic attacks, paranoia, phobias, hallucinations, rapid weight loss, and dementia. Death usually occurs between 7 and 36 months from onset.

== See also ==
- Effects of sleep deprivation on cognitive performance
- Narcolepsy
- Polyphasic sleep
- Sleep medicine
- Sleep onset latency
- Wake therapy
- Tony Wright, who claims to hold the world record for sleep deprivation
- Foreign Correspondent, a 1940 film depicting interrogation by sleep deprivation
