= Effects of sleep deprivation on cognitive performance =

Consequences of not getting enough sleep

The effects of sleep deprivation on cognitive performance are a broad range of impairments resulting from inadequate sleep, impacting attention, executive function and memory. Recent 2025 research specifies these include reduced cognitive flexibility (task-switching accuracy after total sleep deprivation) and prolonged auditory P300 latency with slower reaction time in healthy adults. An estimated 20% of adults or more have some form of sleep deprivation. It may come with insomnia or major depressive disorder, or indicate other mental disorders. The consequences can negatively affect the health, cognition, energy level and mood of a person and anyone around. It increases the risk of human error, especially with technology.

== Attention ==
=== Auditory ===
The primary auditory cortex is highlighted in magenta, and has been known to interact with all areas highlighted on this neural map.

Auditory attention has been examined following sleep deprivation. In one study, researchers examined the auditory attention of twelve non-sleep-deprived subjects and twelve sleep-deprived subjects at various time intervals. Subjects were involved in an auditory attention task, which required the reproduction of the spatial relationships between four letters, using a graph composed of six squares, immediately following the presentation of an item from a tape recorder. It was found that auditory attention of sleep-deprived individuals is affected as the total amount of sleep-deprivation increases, possibly due to lowered perceptual vigilance.

=== Divided ===
Functional magnetic resonance imaging (fMRI) scans of the brains of subjects exposed to thirty-five hours of sleep deprivation indicate that sleep deprivation is related to increases in prefrontal cortex and parietal lobe activation during tasks that combine verbal learning and arithmetic. This is particularly apparent in the right hemisphere. In non-sleep-deprived people involved in verbal learning and arithmetic tasks, the anterior cingulate cortex and the right prefrontal cortex are active. Following sleep deprivation, there is increased activation of the left inferior frontal gyrus and the bilateral parietal lobes. This information suggests that divided attention tasks require more attentional resources than normally required by a non-sleep-deprived person.

=== Exogenous or endogenous ===
Studies using event-related potential (ERP) recordings have found that twenty-four hours of sleep deprivation decreases ERP response to signal inputs from endogenous, but not exogenous, sources. Therefore, it is suggested that sleep deprivation affects endogenously-driven selective attention to a greater extent than exogenously-driven selected attention.

=== Selective ===
Twenty-four hours of sleep deprivation has been found to affect the functional connectivity between the inferior frontal parietal region (IPS) and the parahippocampal place area (PPA). It does not affect the attention modulation index of the PPA. With this information, researchers have concluded that the psychophysiological interaction (PPI) is more involved in selective attention than the IPS and PPA.

Research has found that together, attention and sleep deprivation modulate the parahippocampal place area (PPA) activation and scene processing. Specifically, sleep deprivation was related to significant decreases in PPA activation while attending to scenes and when ignoring scenes. This is explained by the absence of change in the Attention Modulation Index (AMI). Face recognition is not affected by sleep deprivation.

Sleep deprivation has been shown to negatively affect picture classification speed and accuracy, as well as recognition memory. It results in an inability to avoid attending to irrelevant information displayed during attention-related tasks. (Norton) It also decreases activation in the ventral visual area and the frontal parietal control regions.

=== Supervisory ===
Studies involving sleep deprived subjects' performance on choice reaction time tests—in which response inhibition, task shifting skill and task strategy were involved—have been conducted and analyzed. These three cognitive processes are involved and critical in tasks involving supervisory attention, which is defined as behaviour that arises through the selection and implementation of schemas. Following one night of total sleep deprivation, subjects showed no decline in task shifting or response inhibition performance. It affected the ability to use preparatory bias to increase performance speed. It is suggested that the brain's cognitive resources make an active effort to succeed in a challenging task when subjected to sleep deprivation, and that this deficit becomes apparent in tasks involving preparatory bias. Similarly, partial sleep deprivation significantly influenced subjects simple reaction time, thus making it slower than subjects who were well rested

=== Visuospatial ===
Deficits in cognitive performance due to continuous sleep restriction are not well understood. Studies have looked into physiological arousal of the sleep-deprived brain. Participants, whose total amount of sleep had been restricted by 33% throughout one week, were subjected to reaction time tests. The results of these tests were analyzed using quantitative EEG analysis. The results indicate that the frontal regions of the brain are first to be affected, whereas the parietal regions remain active until the effects of sleep deprivation become more severe, which occurred near the end of the week. EEG and ERP analysis reveals that activation deficits are more apparent in the non-dominant hemisphere—than in the dominant hemisphere.

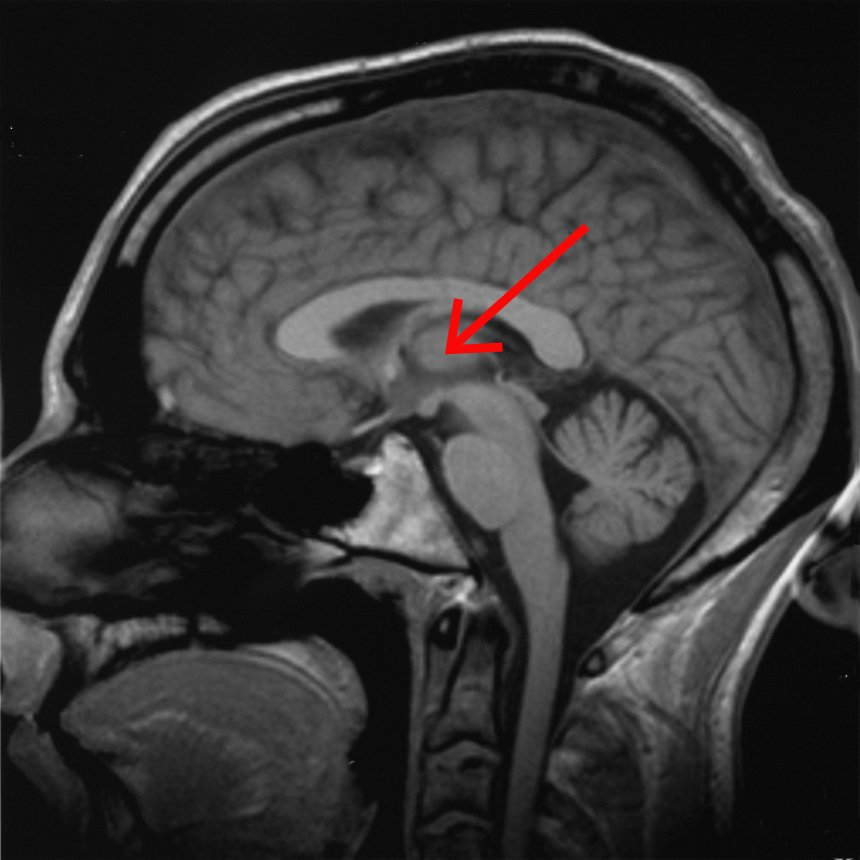
Thalamus

The effects of sleep deprivation on cognitive performance have been studied through the use of parametric visual attention tasks. Functional magnetic resonance imaging of participants' brains who were involved in ball-tracking tasks of various difficulty levels were obtained. These images were taken during rested wakefulness and again after one night of sleep deprivation. The thalamus is more highly activated when accompanied by sleep deprivation—than when the subject is in a state of rested wakefulness. Contrarily, the thalamus is more highly activated during difficult tasks accompanied by rested wakefulness, but not during a state of sleep deprivation. Researchers propose that the thalamic resources, which are normally activated during difficult tasks, are being activated in an attempt to maintain alertness during states of sleep deprivation. An increase in thalamic activation is related to a decrease in the parietal, prefrontal and cingulate cortex activation, resulting in the overall impairment of attentional networks, which are necessary for visuospatial attention performance.

Functional magnetic resonance imaging (fMRI) studies indicate that the posterior cingulate (PCC) and medial prefrontal cortex are involved in the anticipatory allocation of spatial attention. When sleep-deprived, PCC activity decreases, impairing selective attention. Subjects were exposed to an attention-shifting task involving spatially informative, misleading and uninformative cues preceding the stimuli. When sleep-deprived, subjects showed increased activation in the left intraparietal sulcus. This region is activated when exposed to stimuli in unexpected locations. These findings suggest that sleep-deprived people may be impaired in their ability to anticipate the locations of upcoming events. Inability to avoid attending to irrelevant events may also be induced by sleep-deprivation.

By contrast, other studies have indicated that the effects of sleep deprivation on cognitive performance, specifically sustained visual attention, are more global and bilateral in nature (as opposed to more lateralized deficit explanations). In a study using the Choice Visual Perception Task, subjects were exposed to stimuli appearing in various locations in visual space. Results indicate that sleep deprivation results in a general decline in visual attention. It is also suggested that the sleep-deprived brain is able to maintain a certain level of cognitive performance during tasks requiring divided attention—by recruiting additional cortical regions that are not normally used for such tasks.

=== Neural substrates ===
Parietal lobe

The parietal lobes of the brain are largely involved in attention. Lesions to this region of the brain in humans result in difficulty or inability to attend to events that are contralateral to the lesioned hemisphere. Those with lesions to the posterior parietal lobe have little to no difficulty shifting attention to and from stimuli appearing in the space ipsilateral to the lesioned hemisphere. They display a slowed response in shifting their focus of current attention to events and stimuli appearing contralateral to the lesioned hemisphere.

Studies involving single-unit recordings from the parietal lobes of monkeys have indicated that there are neurons solely involved in integrating visual spatial information with postural information. Without this apparent combining of spatial information, it would be difficult or impossible to locate objects in external space (as information provided solely by the retina is insufficient). The position of the eyes, head and body must also be taken into consideration.

In addition, studies involving transcranial magnetic stimulation application over the parietal lobes as well as positron emission tomography (PET) analysis of the parietal lobes suggest that this region is involved in conjunction searches, but not in single-feature searches (see Visual search for supplementary information).

== Executive function ==
Prefrontal cortex

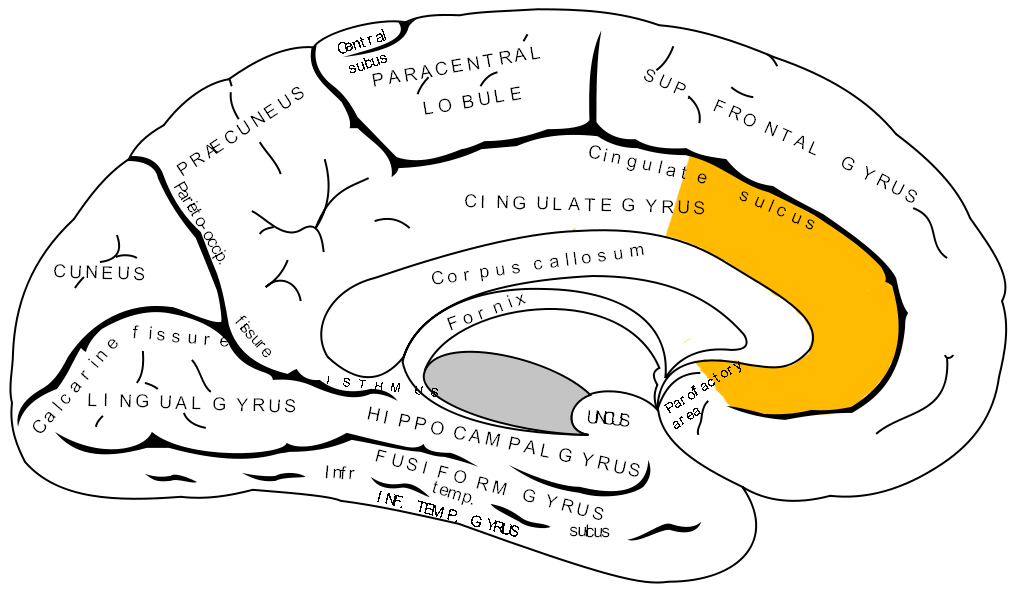
Anterior cingulate cortex

Executive functioning is "the ability to plan and coordinate a willful action in the face of alternatives, to monitor and update action as necessary and suppress distracting material by focusing attention on the task at hand". The prefrontal cortex has been identified as the most important region involved in executive functioning.

Among what researchers believe to be the most basic executive functions of the brain are three which have been termed 'shifting', 'updating', and 'inhibition':

- Shifting, as in shifting back and forth between different tasks, is considered a very important mental behavior involved in executive functioning, as it involves active disengagement from the present task and engaging in a new task.

- Updating is believed to be involved in working memory (closely associated with the function of the prefrontal cortex), where the information that is active needs to be updated by replacing old, now irrelevant information with new, relevant information based on the objective.

- Inhibition involves controlled and deliberate impedance of automatic, predominant responses.

The anterior cingulate cortex has been implemented in the process of inhibiting a habitual response or detecting possible conflicts in responses; this is shown by the Stroop test. Sleep deprivation impairs cognitive flexibility, a key aspect of executive function involving task switching. A 2025 scoping review found consistent deficits in task-switching accuracy and cognitive flexibility following total sleep deprivation (less consistent for partial), alongside changes in neural mechanisms like prefrontal and striatal activity. Similarly, sleep deprivation prolongs auditory P300 latency and reaction time in healthy adults, with acute deprivation causing greater slowing than chronic. Studies have found that as little as 36 hours of sleep deprivation can cause a performance reduction in tasks requiring these executive functions.

Frontal lobe.

The processes above illustrate a model of controlled versus automatic behavior that was hypothesized by Shallice et al. (1989), called the supervisory attentional system. This system is believed to come into play when intervention of habitual response is necessary. Damage to the prefrontal cortex will cause a breakdown in this system, resulting in utilization behaviors. These behaviors would include spontaneous sequences of action on irrelevant objects in the surroundings with no clear goal in mind. This theory has helped to extend the current knowledge on executive functions.

=== Decision making ===
Decision making involves a range of executive functions that need to be combined and organized in order to respond in the most appropriate manner (i.e., respond with the most advantageous decision). There are many aspects to the process of decision making, including those discussed above.

Decision-making is among the cognitive and behavioral processes that are severely hampered by prolonged sleep deprivation. Extended night shifts have been found to significantly impair attentiveness and memory recall for shift workers, especially nurses and other healthcare professionals. Sixty-nine percent (69%) of one hundred shift-working nurses in the study reported having inadequate sleep, which was linked to worse cognitive function, such as shorter reaction times and more mathematical errors. Additionally, lack of sleep causes increased anxiety-like behaviors and impairs the brain's ability to block out unimportant stimuli when performing tasks requiring attention. Disruptions in important brain circuits and the downregulation of proteins necessary for cognitive stability are the causes of these behavioral abnormalities. Other processes involved that correlate to executive function will be discussed below.

=== Complexity ===
While most important decisions are made over a longer period of time involving more in-depth cognitive analysis, humans usually have limited time in which to assimilate a large amount of information into an informed decision. Lack of sleep appears to negatively affect one's ability to appreciate and respond to increasing complexity, as was found in performance deficits after one night of sleep deprivation on a simulated marketing game.

The game involved subjects promoting a fictional product while getting feedback on the financial effects of their decisions. They would continuously have to take into account new variables to succeed which would increase the game's complexity.

Other examples of inability to process complex information includes a decrease in ability to assess facial expressions, an increase in resolving to the use of stereotypes and racial biases in evaluations, and an increase in taking the easier solution to solving interpersonal problems.

=== Innovation ===
Intuitively, because sleep deprivation had a negative effect on handling the complexity of the simulated marketing game, it also affected innovative processes as subjects failed to adopt a more innovative (and rewarding) style of play. Innovative thinking involves the construction of new behaviors based on the assimilation of continuously changing or novel information. In a study of military personnel who had undergone two nights of sleep deprivation, results showed marked reductions in the ability to generate ideas about a given topic (categories test); this is known as ideational fluency.

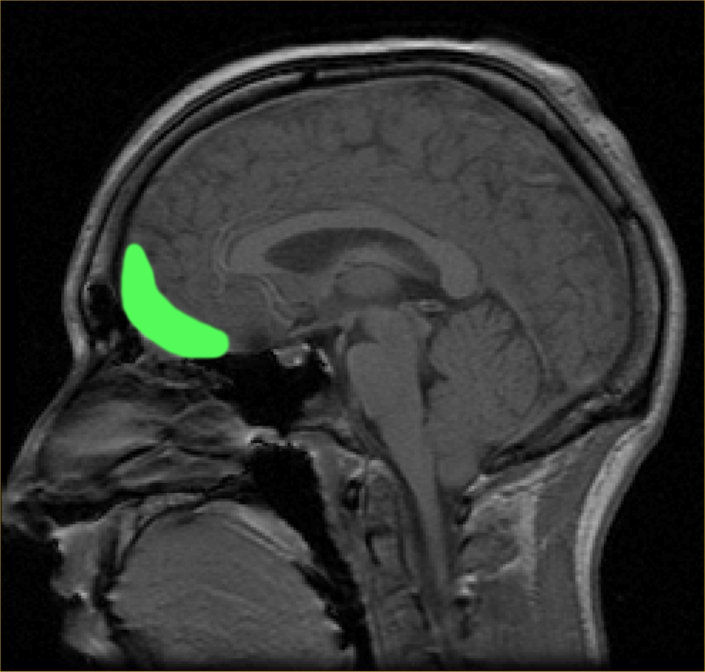
Approximate location of the Orbitofrontal cortex

=== Risk ===
Risk versus reward analysis is an important part of decision making. Attempting to create a representation and response to a risky situation highly involves the orbitofrontal cortex. In a study that involved risk taking analysis of drivers who had been driving for 12 hours straight, it was found that they were more willing to make hazardous maneuvers (and were reluctant to adopt any form of a cautious driving style).

Some studies shed further light on this phenomenon. One study used real-life decision making scenarios involving choosing cards from 1 of 4 decks of cards. Different cards were considered as a reward while the others were a penalty. The sleep-deprived subjects failed to alter their selection methods, continuing to choose cards from decks that were producing a high amount of penalty cards, whereas the control subjects were able to change their choosing strategy by a cost-benefit analysis based on monitoring the outcomes they were getting as they went along.

=== Planning ===
The process of planning would be done congruently with decision making in determining the outcome behavior. As has been shown so far, sleep deprivation has many detrimental effects on executive functions and planning is not spared. One study involved cadets who were required to complete simulated military operations under sleep deprived conditions. It showed a decrease in the subjects ability to "plan on the fly" and overall outcomes were less than those of well-rested cadets.

Another psychological test used to assess planning, decision making and other executive functions is the Tower of London test. After 45–50 hours of sleep deprivation, a study found subjects took longer and required more moves to finish it than did the controls.

=== Error correction ===
Being able to show insight into one's performance on different tasks and correct or modify those behaviors if they are incorrect is an important part of executive functioning. The problems that could be associated with being unable to learn from a mistake or adapt to a mistake could impair many behaviors.

A common test used to assess error correction and trouble shooting with regards to the frontal lobe is the Wisconsin Card Sorting Test. This test involves a change in the rules which requires a shift in strategy. In the same study discussed above, detriments were also found on this task in the sleep deprived people.

== Memory ==
Research evidence suggests that sleep is involved in the acquisition, maintenance and retrieval of memories as well as memory consolidation. Subsequently, sleep deprivation has been shown to affect working and long-term memory processes.

=== Working ===
Sleep deprivation increases the number of errors made on working memory tasks. In one study, the working memory task involved illuminating a sequence of 3 or 4 coloured lights, then asking both sleep-deprived and non-sleep deprived people to memorize and repeat back the sequence. The sleep deprived performed the task much faster than those in the control condition (i.e., not sleep deprived), which initially appeared to be a positive effect. A significantly different number of errors were made, with the fatigued group performing much worse.

Evidence from imaging studies also demonstrates the influence of sleep deprivation on working memory. EEG studies have documented lower accuracy and slower reaction times among sleep deprived participants performing working memory tasks. Decreasing alertness and lack of focus triggered deficits in working memory that are accompanied by significant degradation of event-related potentials.

PET scanning shows global decrease in glucose metabolism in response to sleep deprivation. As subjects become increasingly impaired on working memory tasks, a more specific decrease of glucose occurs in the thalamus, prefrontal cortex and posterior parietal cortex.

Functional magnetic resonance imaging (fMRI) scans following brief sleep deprivation (24 hours or less) show increases in thalamic activation. Verbal working memory tasks normally cause increases in left temporal lobe activity. After 35 hours come noted decreases in temporal lobe activation and increases in parietal lobe activation.

Working memory model

The working memory span is also affected by sleep deprivation. When sleep deprived participants in a study were asked to remember a nonsense word and locate it among a number of similar words, the length of time they could hold it in their working memory decreased by 38% compared to rested persons.

=== Long-term ===
One way sleep is involved in the creation of long-term memories is through memory consolidation—the process by which a new memory is changed into a more permanent form. This is believed to be accomplished by creating connections between the medial temporal lobes and neocortical areas. NREM (non-REM) and REM sleep are both believed to be implicated, with current theories suggesting NREM is most particularly involved in procedural memory and REM with declarative memory.

Animal studies have partly validated these claims. For instance, one study conducted with rats showed that REM sleep deprivation after learning a new task disrupted their ability to perform the task again later. This was especially true if the task was complex (i.e., involved using unusual information or developing novel adaptive behaviours).

There is similar evidence for the role of sleep in procedural memory in humans. Participants in one study were trained on a procedural memory skill involving perceptual-motor skills. Those who were NREM sleep deprived performed significantly worse on subsequent trials compared to those who were fully rested. Another study using a visual-motor procedural memory task documented similar results. Participants who were sleep deprived following the initial training showed no improvement on trials the next day, while those who received sleep showed significant positive changes. Studies such as these clearly demonstrate the disruptive influence sleep deprivation has on memory consolidation of procedural and declarative memories.

Sleep deprivation also has a documented effect on the ability to acquire new memories for subsequent consolidation. A study done on mice that were sleep deprived before learning a new skill but allowed to rest afterward displayed a similar number of errors on later trials as the mice that were sleep deprived only after the initial learning. In this case, it is hypothesized that rather than preventing the memory from being consolidated, sleep deprivation interfered with the initial acquisition of the memory. Mice with pre-trial sleep deprivation also took significantly longer to learn a task than well-rested mice.

Sleep deprivation is also implicated in impaired ability to retrieve stored long-term memories. When an aversive stimulus was included in a trial (i.e., a blowdryer blasting hot air and noise at a mouse), mice that were sleep deprived were less anxious on subsequent trials. This suggests they had not retrieved all of the memory related to the unpleasant experience.

=== Explanations ===
Several theories have been put forth to explain the effect sleep deprivation has on memory.

One early study into neurochemical influences on sleep and memory was conducted with cats and demonstrated that sleep deprivation increased brain protein synthesis. There is evidence that these altered levels of proteins could increase the excitability of the central nervous system, thus increasing the susceptibility of the brain to other neurochemical agents that can cause amnesia. Further research has revealed that the protein kinase A (PKA) signaling pathway is crucial to long-term memory. If PKA or protein synthesis inhibition occurs at certain moments during sleep, memory consolidation can be disrupted. In addition, mice with genetic inhibition of PKA have been shown to have long-term memory deficits. Thus, sleep deprivation may act through the inhibition of these protein synthesis pathways.

Acetylcholine (ACh) may also be involved in the effects of sleep deprivation, particularly with regards to spatial memory. Muscarinic antagonists, or chemicals that block ACh, impair spatial learning when administered prior to a training task among rats. ACh levels are also found to be lower when measured following a period of sleep deprivation. ACh has also been shown to increase the activity of the PKA pathway, which is needed for memory consolidation.

Serotonin levels (in the form of 5-HT) have been shown to decrease during REM and NREM sleep, leading some researchers to believe that it is also involved in memory consolidation during sleep. Mice lacking the receptor gene for 5-HT engage in more REM sleep and perform better on spatial memory tasks. Researchers have hypothesized that sleep deprivation interferes with the normal reduction in levels of 5-HT, impairing the process of memory consolidation.

Another theory suggests that the stress brought on by sleep deprivation affects memory consolidation by changing the concentration of corticosteroids in the body. This was simulated in one study by elevating the concentration of glucocorticoids during early sleep stages. The observed effects on memory retention the next day were similar to those obtained from people who had received no sleep.

Sleep deprivation may affect memory by interfering with neuroplasticity as measured by long-term potentiation in the hippocampus. This reduced plasticity may be the root cause of impairments in both working memory among humans and spatial memory among rats. Sleep deprivation may additionally affect memory by reducing the proliferation of cells in the hippocampus.

Sleep deprivation has also been associated with decreased overall membrane excitability of neurons in the brain. Activation of these membranes is critical for the formation of memories. Mitochondria play an essential role in modulating neuron excitability, and research has shown that sleep deprivation is involved in inhibiting mitochondrial metabolism.

== Traffic collision risk ==
Reduced duration of sleep, as well as an increase in time spent awake, are factors that highly contribute to the risk of traffic collisions, the severity and fatality rates of which are on the same level as driving under the influence of alcohol, with 19 hours of wakefulness corresponding to a BAC of 0.05%, and 24 hours of wakefulness corresponding to a BAC of 0.10%. Compounding this is the proven dissociation between objective performance and subjective alertness; people vastly underestimate the effect that sleep deprivation has on their cognitive performance, particularly during the circadian night.

Many of acute sleep deprivation's effects can be countered by napping, the longer the more beneficial. Some industries, particularly the Fire Service, have traditionally allowed workers to sleep while on duty, between calls for service. In one study of EMS providers, 24-hour shifts were not associated with a higher frequency of negative safety outcomes when compared to shorter shifts.

This is especially relevant for young adults who require around eight hours of sleep at night to overcome excessive daytime sleepiness. They are among the highest risk group for driving while feeling tired and sleep deprivation related crashes.

== Effects on brain regions ==
=== Neurobiological basis of sleep deprivation ===
Lack of sleep changes how genes are expressed and interferes with neurobiological functions that are necessary for cognitive function. Research indicates a decline in the expression of proteins that are essential for memory consolidation and synaptic plasticity, including CREB and PKCγ. These molecular abnormalities damage the cerebellum and hippocampus, which results in deficiencies in long-term memory functions and spatial working memory. Chronic sleep deprivation also raises the brain's amyloid-beta aggregation, which is linked to neurodegenerative diseases like Alzheimer's. Impaired clearance mechanisms during reduced sleep worsen this neurotoxic environment. Neuroimaging studies also show a shift of cognitive resources, which decreases activation in the prefrontal cortex and parietal lobes and increases activation in areas like the thalamus. However, this compensating strategy is not enough to sustain the best possible cognitive function throughout extended periods of wakefulness.

== Physical affects ==
=== Occupational impacts ===
Sleep deprivation disproportionately affects healthcare workers, especially those who work shifts. Significant cognitive impairments, such as shorter attention spans, slower reaction times, and mistakes in patient care tasks during night shifts, were found in a study of nurses working rotating hours. Longer workdays than twelve hours intensify these impacts, increasing the risk of workplace accidents and jeopardizing patient safety. Cognitive testing revealed that 68% of nurses had memory problems when working nights as opposed to days, and 83% of nurses performed worse on vigilance tests. [30] In order to reduce the cognitive and occupational dangers associated with sleep deprivation in healthcare settings, these findings highlight the urgent need for interventions such as required rest times, optimized shift scheduling, and awareness campaigns.

=== Athlete's performances ===
Lack of sleep has a significant impact on cognitive and physical performance, especially in endurance sports. Long-term sleep deprivation was shown to affect neurobehavioral function, including hallucinations and reduced reaction times, in a study of ultramarathon runners. Race length and cognitive problems did not directly correlate, according to the study, indicating that the length of sleep loss is more closely related to the severity of damage. In addition, athletes who were sleep deprived displayed a decreased ability to make decisions and assimilate new information. These deficiencies are linked to changed thalamic and prefrontal cortical activation, which are essential for executive function and vigilance maintenance. [61] To minimize these effects and improve training results and competition performance, recovery techniques such as planned naps and better sleep hygiene are crucial.

== See also ==
- Affective neuroscience
- Cognitive psychology
- Cognitive psychophysiology
- Experimental psychology
- List of neuroscience topics
- List of neuroscientists
- Neuroscience journals
- Social neuroscience
- Skylab 4
