= NASA categories of evidence =

NASA Categories of Evidence comprise a matrix or scale denoting the sources of evidence provided in the Human Research Program's various evidence reports, and thus potentially their probative value and efficacy. Authors in the Program were urged to label their evidence according to whether it was based on controlled experiments, observation, or expert opinion.

Broad "Experimental" Design Type	Silagy & Haines Levels of Evidence	Nasa Categories of Evidence
Controlled	Ia - Meta-analysis of randomized trials	I - At least one randomized, controlled trial
Controlled	Ib - At least one randomized trial	I - At least one randomized, controlled trial
Controlled	IIa - At least one controlled study without randomization	II - At least one controlled study without randomization, including cohort, case-control, or subject operating as own control.
Controlled	IIb - At least one other quasi-experimental study	II - At least one controlled study without randomization, including cohort, case-control, or subject operating as own control.
Observational	III - Non-experimental descriptive studies, e.g. comparative correlation or case studies.	III - Non-experimental observations or comparative, correlation, and case or case-series studies.
Opinion	IV - Expert committee reports or opinions or clinical experiences of respected authorities.	IV - Expert committee reports or opinions of respected authorities based on clinical experiences, bench research, or "first principles".
