= Psychological stress and sleep =

Effects of stress on sleep patterns

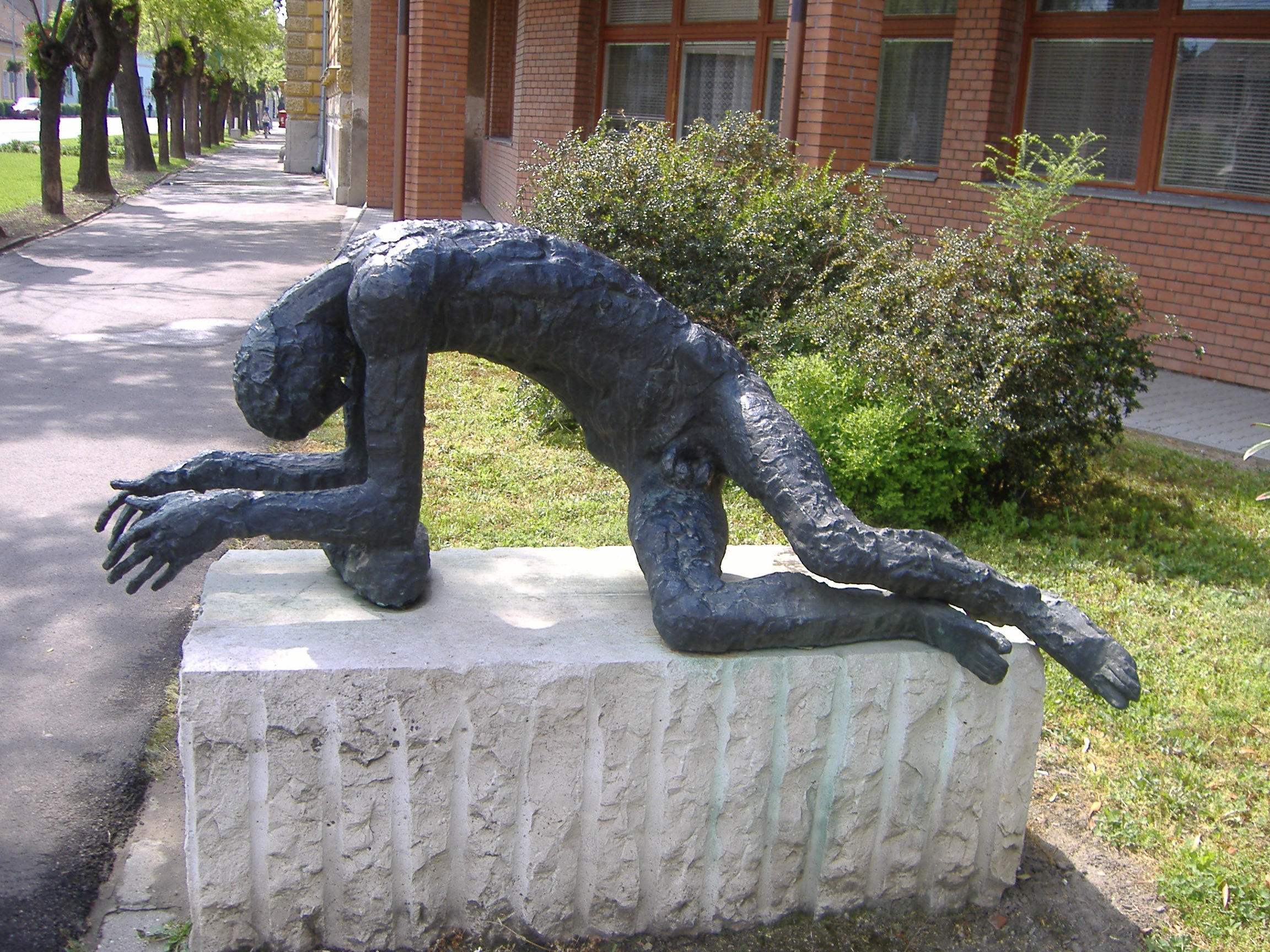
"Tired man": sculpture by József Somogyi in Makó, Hungary

Sleep is a naturally recurring state of mind and body, characterized by altered consciousness, relatively inhibited sensory activity, reduced muscle activity, and inhibition of nearly all voluntary muscles during rapid eye movement (REM) sleep, and reduced interactions with surroundings.

An essential aspect of sleep is that it provides the human body with a period of reduced functioning that allows for the systems throughout the body to be repaired. This time allows for the body to recharge and return to a phase of optimal functioning. It is recommended that adults get 7 to 9 hours of sleep each night. Sleep is regulated by an internal process known as the circadian rhythm. This 24-hour cycle regulates periods of alertness and tiredness that an individual experiences. The correlation between psychological stress and sleep is complex and not fully understood. In fact, many studies have found a bidirectional relationship between stress and sleep. This means that sleep quality can affect stress levels, and stress levels can affect sleep quality. Sleep change depends on the type of stressor, sleep perception, related psychiatric conditions, environmental factors, and physiological limits.

== Stress/sleep cycle ==
It is critical that we receive an adequate amount of sleep each night. According to the Centers for Disease Control and Prevention, people 18–60 years old need 7 or more hours of sleep per night. The majority of college students fall in this age range. While sleep is critical, many college students do not reach this threshold amount of sleep, and subsequently face detrimental effects. However, it is clear that stress and sleep in college students are interrelated, instead of one only affecting the other. "Stress and sleep affect each other. Poor sleep can increase stress, otherwise high-stress can also cause sleep disturbances". As stated in a different way, the way stress and sleep are related is bidirectional in nature.

== Types of stressors ==
Stressors can be categorized into the Challenge/Hindrance stressor model. Challenge stressors, while unpleasant, allow for growth and achievement such as time pressure in a work context. Hindrance stressors are those that cause unnecessary burdens and do not contribute to achievement such as poor work supervision. Self-reported quality of sleep reduces in relation to more hindrance stressors but not to challenge stressors.

== Sleep quality perception ==
Insomnia is a common condition affecting up to a fifth of the population in many countries across the world and is often complicated by several psychiatric conditions. Paradoxical insomnia is the phenomenon of a discrepancy between reported sleep duration and objective measurement of sleep. In some cases, however, the stress and anxiety produced do result in an objective reduction in the quality of sleep.

=== Stress factors that lead to a lack of sleep ===
Stress, often fueled by overthinking, caffeine, and cortisol, disrupts sleep. Rumination prevents relaxation, while caffeine and cortisol heighten alertness. Sleep deprivation intensifies stress, creating a harmful cycle. This impacts daily function and overall well-being.

=== Increased prevalence of stress for teenagers ===
There are consistent stressors in life, some that are good, referred to as eustress, and some that are bad, which are referred to as distress. While these stressors have not necessarily increased over the years, the overall average stress levels have increased as data has shown that the typical high school student today has the same amount of anxiety as a psychiatric patient in the 1950s. The average stress level in the United States—Gen Z adults (5.6 out of 101), millennials (5.7) and Gen Xers (5.2) reported is far above past average levels and is the highest it has been in the last decade. There is also evidence showing that age impacts the correlation between lack of sleep and stress.

Millennials (born between 1981 and 1996) and Gen Zers (born between 1997 and 2012) report the highest levels of stress out of all the generations, in which 44% of millennials and 48% of Gen Zers report being stressed all or most of the time. Correspondingly, younger Americans report getting fewer hours of sleep per night, in which a large portion only sleeps for about 6.5-7.5 hours per night on average. These correlating statistics reveal an epidemic that is being created with stress and an increased risk of chronic sleep deprivation. Stress often leads to difficulties falling asleep and staying asleep, however, a lack of sleep can also contribute to one's stress levels. This relationship leads to a never-ending cycle of being too stressed to sleep and then being unable to control one's anxieties because of the impacts of a lack of sleep. Unfortunately, this troubling cycle also causes an increased risk for the potential impacts of sleep deprivation and excessive stress, including many physical and mental health issues. These issues can have long-term consequences that may affect one's social life, academic capabilities, and relationships with others.

== Neuropsychiatric mechanisms ==
Sleep can be broadly split into the lighter "rapid eye movement" (REM) and deeper "non-rapid eye movement" (NREM). Changes in sleep phase vary in animal models depending on the stressor but do not alter total sleep duration except for novelty which reduces both REM and NREM. Conditioned fear, for example, reduces REM sleep whereas auditory stimulation increases it.

In humans, models of stress have been closely linked to the context depression. Changes in sleep patterns in depression are very close to those seen in acutely stressed animals; these changes can be used as a predictor for developing depression. Once again, studies have shown a bidirectional nature between depressive symptoms and lack of sleep due to stress. Long-term/chronic psychosocial stress is known to cause depression symptoms but the effect of chronic stress on sleep can lead to a ripple effect of further damage including poor emotional stability, lowered attention span and self-control, and worse performance on cognitive tasks. Early life sleep disruption caused by stressors may affect neuroplasticity and synaptic connectivity potentially leading to the development of mood disorders. This poor sleep may become a stressor itself compounding the phenomenon.

=== Cholinergic neurons ===
In animal studies, psychologically stressed rats display an increase in total REM sleep and the average length of REM phase duration (but not the number of cycles). This change is mediated by cholinergic neurons as stressed animals' prolonged REM cycles can be reduced by using a cholinergic antagonist (atropine). One study found that auditory stimulation stressors act similarly by inhibiting the cholinergic reduction of REM sleep. Chronic mildly stressed rats display a reduction in inhibitory GABA receptors in the hypothalamus (increasing the release of stress hormones) and brain stem among others. Within the pedunculopontine tegmentum region, in the brainstem, reduced GABA imbibition of cholinergic neurons acts again in the same way in increasing REM sleep duration.

=== Hypothalamic-pituitary-adrenal axis ===
The neuroendocrine hypothalamic-pituitary-adrenal axis is a system of hormones that culminates in the release of cortisol from the adrenal glands in response to acute stress and is also seen to regulate sleep patterns. The reduction in GABA receptors in the hypothalamus seen in chronic stress reduces the inhibition of stress hormone release however does not appear to impact sleep patterns after exposure to a stressful social stimulus in animals.

==== Prenatal and childhood stress ====
Chronic maternal stress in pregnancy exposes the fetus to increased levels of glucocorticoid and inflammatory markers which in turn negatively affects the H-P-A axis and disrupts sleep regulation of the fetus. Up until the age of 2 years, children who have been exposed to prenatal stress have shortened and disorganized sleeping patterns. During early childhood development, the child's brain is particularly sensitive to adverse events such as family conflict, maternal postnatal depression, or abuse. It is thought that it is via sensitization of the H-P-A axis that an abnormal stress response is developed in response to these events/stressors which in turn causes emotional disorders and later life sleeping disorders.

=== Stress and substance abuse ===
Chronic stress can disrupt the body's stress response system (HPA axis). This imbalance can cause people recovering from alcoholism to relapse.

== Immune mediation ==
Observations have been made that there is an association between stress, sleep, and Interleukin-6 proposing a possible mechanism for sleep changes. During both chronic and acute phase sleep deprivation, there are increases in the pro-inflammatory cytokine Interleukin-6 (IL-6). Not only is IL-6 influenced by the circadian rhythm but its effectiveness is increased by sleep itself as there is an increase in serum IL-6 receptors during sleep. After periods of long sleep deprivation, the first post-deprivation sleep shows a marked drop in IL-6 and an increase in slow wave sleep / "deep sleep". Similarly napping during the daytime has been shown to decrease IL-6 and reduce tiredness. When humans are injected with exogenous IL-6 they display an increase in fatigue and other sickness behaviour.

This IL-6 increase is also observed during times of increased psychological stress. In a laboratory setting, individuals exposed to psychological stressors have had raised IL-6 (an acute-phase protein CRP) measured especially in those who displayed anger or anxiety in response to the stressful stimulus. Just as the human body responds to inflammation-inducing illness with increased fatigue or reduced sleep quality, so too does it respond to psychological stress with a sickness behavior of tiredness and poor sleep quality. While sleep is important for recovery from stress, as, with an inflammatory illness, continuous and long-term increases of inflammatory markers with its associated behaviors may be considered maladaptive and be linked to long-term inefficient sleep.

== Military context ==
Since the American Civil War, there have been multiple "war syndromes" reported such as 'irritable heart', 'effort syndrome' and 'Gulf War Syndrome'. Thought to be discrete and different from post-traumatic stress disorder (PTSD), these war syndromes have a range of physical symptoms but commonly feature sleep disturbances, tiredness, poor concentration, and nightmares. The historic picture is unclear due to poor contemporary understanding of psychological illness and, in more modern conflicts, gathering data has been difficult due to operational priorities; no cause has been identified that is not connected to psychological stress.

=== PTSD ===
==== Sleep and PTSD ====
Sleep is often a core focus for both diagnosis and management of PTSD with 70% of PTSD patients reporting insomnia or sleep disturbances. When studied against controls, however, little difference was measured in the quality of sleep suggesting paradoxical insomnia along with physiological H-P-A axis involvement and "fight or flight responses". It is on this basis that CBT, a non-pharmacological therapy, is justified along with pharmacological intervention.

==== Dreams and Trauma ====
Research has explored the link between stress, trauma, and dreams. Studies on people who experienced the COVID-19 pandemic found increased dream activity, often related to past traumatic events rather than the pandemic itself. This suggests that significant stress can trigger vivid or disturbing dreams, even if the current situation isn't directly traumatic.

Stress and trauma can lead to vivid dreams. This common type of PTSD dream involves reliving a traumatic event, often accompanied by intense emotions like fear, anger, or anxiety upon waking.

== Occupational context ==
One of the greatest factors affecting the stress and sleep of humans is their commitment to their jobs. In our society, one's employment schedule often dictates their sleep schedule. The bidirectional relationship between stress and sleep is also scientifically supported in terms of employment. When an employee does not get quality sleep, this often leads to poor performance at work and a greater chance of experiencing stress related to work. Similarly, when a person is experiencing occupational stress, their sleep is almost immediately negatively influenced. When individuals experience high levels of stress and insufficient amounts of sleep their mental and physical health is jeopardized.

=== Development of occupational stress ===
Occupational stress can arise from various factors. Work schedules, time commitments, lack of support, and workplace conflicts are common contributors. Job demands vary widely across different occupations. Many jobs require at least 40-hour workweeks, leaving limited personal time. Irregular schedules, especially night shifts, disrupt daily routines and interfere with the body's natural sleep-wake cycle.

Employees often experience stress due to insufficient support and recognition from supervisors. This can lead to increased workload, uncertainty, and job dissatisfaction. Clear expectations and supportive leadership are crucial for employee well-being.

Workplace conflicts, particularly those involving power imbalances, are significant stressors. These conflicts create hostile work environments, impacting employee morale, productivity, and overall job satisfaction. Sexual harassment is a severe form of workplace conflict with devastating consequences.

=== Risk factors and interventions ===
Stress and sleep deprivation can negatively impact daily life. These factors often lead to decreased work performance, increased absenteeism, and a higher risk of illness. People who consistently lack sleep are more susceptible to heart disease, diabetes, and mental health issues such as depression and anxiety.

To combat these problems, individuals and employers can take steps to reduce stress and improve sleep. Employers can create healthier work environments by managing workloads, setting clear expectations, and fostering a supportive atmosphere. Employees can benefit from stress management techniques like cognitive-behavioral therapy and self-care practices. Practicing simple self-care routines and setting aside time for the things that one enjoys will aid in minimizing the levels of stress that employees experience.

== Performance and attention context ==
While stress and sleep greatly impact each other, their effect permeates into many more aspects of daily life. One specific concern is the harmful effects on cognitive performance and attention span. In addition, sleep deprivation can cause a change in perceptions as well. Being sleep-deprived for 24 hours leads to a dramatic decrease in cognitive performance tests similar to college exams, and causes individuals to have false perceptions about their performance. Hence, sleep-deprived individuals are cognitively performing worse but are not aware of it. In addition to cognitive performance, sleep deprivation can cause a decreased attention span on specific tasks at hand. This has further implications such as making more mistakes or not being as efficient. It can become a cycle of high stress, poor sleep, and lack of attention when these three things are intermixed.

== Short-term physical health impacts of stress and sleep deprivation ==
Both excessive stress and sleep deprivation cause physical health impacts that may affect a person short-term or long-term. These impacts range in severity and it is important to be aware of the increased risk of health issues that may arise due to the stress-sleep cycle. Many of the physical impacts of stress overlap with the physical impacts of sleep deprivation, including short-term impacts like fatigue and headaches, and long-term impacts like high blood pressure, heart disease, diabetes, and obesity.

Fatigue is a clear side effect of sleep deprivation, however, when combined with excessive stress, the feeling of fatigue can become overwhelming because one's body is having to work harder and is under more pressure which causes a person to feel further fatigued. Headaches are another short-term impact that occurs often for those who are feeling excessive levels of stress since stress often triggers a fight or flight response which can create tension headaches. When lack of sleep and excessive stress combine, the impacts of fatigue and headaches greatly increase. Although these impacts are both short-term, they can last for days, weeks, or even months if the stress continues to overwhelm a person and cause them to struggle to fall and stay asleep.

== Long-term physical health impacts of stress and sleep deprivation ==
=== Cardiovascular impacts ===
Long-term effects can result from years of persistent feelings of excessive levels of stress and consequently getting a consistent lack of sleep. Excessive stress and sleep deprivation can cause cardiovascular issues, such as high blood pressure and heart disease. In a study focusing on the impacts of chronic stress on the heart, it was found that during times of chronic stress, the body hyperactivates the sympathetic nervous system which leads to changes in heart rate variability. Due to these changes in heart rate variability, which can harm the capabilities and strength of the heart, the risk of heart disease greatly increases due to elevated blood sugar and blood pressure levels. Prolongation of this stress on the body can cause plaque buildup in the artery walls which impedes blood flow and results in a much higher likelihood of major cardiovascular events, including heart attack and stroke.

Sleep also adds to these cardiovascular impacts because blood pressure normally decreases during sleep. As a result, someone with a consistent lack of sleep has higher blood pressure levels for longer periods of time. In a study that was conducted to find the correlation between sleep deprivation and cardiovascular issues, it was found that one hour less of sleep each night increased the risk of calcium build-up in the arteries by 33%. Calcium buildup in the arteries is a major cause of plaque buildup, which was also mentioned as highly affected by increased stress levels. When combined, excessive stress and sleep deprivation cause a much larger increase in plaque buildup which can lead to an increased risk of heart disease, stroke, and high blood pressure. When someone is constantly feeling stressed throughout their day and then struggles to fall and stay asleep due to stress and anxiety, it creates a continued cycle of strain on the heart.

=== Increased chance of obesity ===
When people are stressed, their bodies release a hormone called cortisol. This can increase appetite and cravings for unhealthy foods, like sugary or fatty snacks. Stress also makes it harder to control eating habits.

Not getting enough sleep interferes with the body's hormones that control hunger and fullness. When tired, one is more likely to feel hungry and less likely to burn calories through exercise.

Stress and lack of sleep often go together and can make it much easier to gain weight.
