= Sleep and memory =

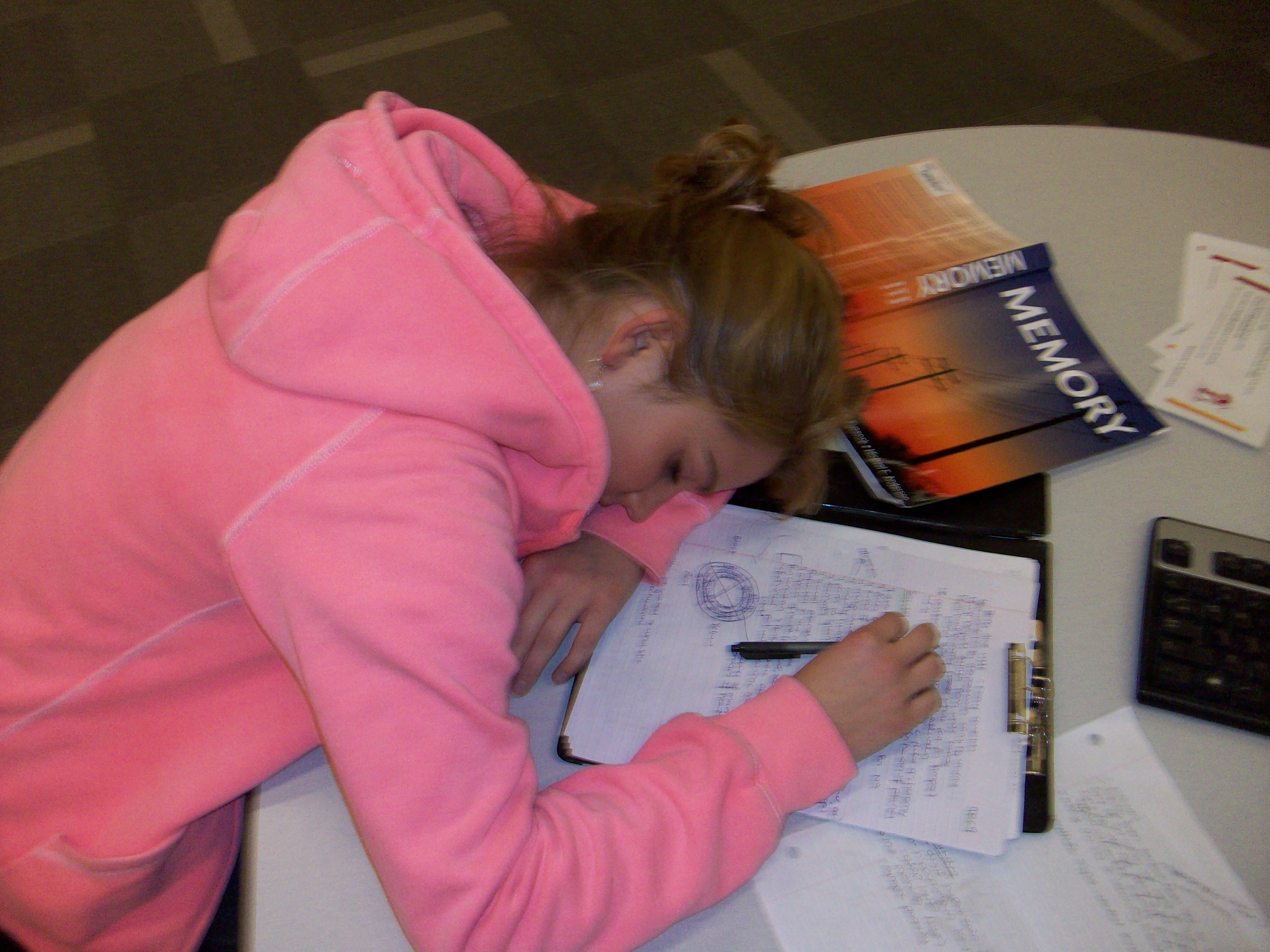
Young woman asleep over study materials

The relationship between sleep and memory has been studied since at least the early 19th century. Memory, the cognitive process of storing and retrieving past experiences, learning and recognition, is a product of brain plasticity, the structural changes within synapses that create associations between stimuli. Stimuli are encoded within milliseconds; however, the long-term maintenance of memories can take additional minutes, days, or even years to fully consolidate and become a stable memory that is accessible (more resistant to change or interference). Therefore, the formation of a specific memory occurs rapidly, but the evolution of a memory is often an ongoing process.

Memory processes have been shown to be stabilized and enhanced (sped up and/or integrated) and memories better consolidated by nocturnal sleep and daytime naps. Certain sleep stages have been demonstrated as improving an individual's memory, though this is task-specific. Generally, declarative memories are believed to be enhanced by slow-wave sleep, while non-declarative memories are enhanced by rapid eye movement (REM) sleep, although there are some inconsistencies among experimental results. The effect of sleep on memory, especially as it pertains to the human brain, is an active field of research in neurology, psychology, and related disciplines.

== History ==
In 1801, David Hartley first suggested that dreaming altered the associative planetary links within the brain during rapid eye movement (REM) periods of the sleep cycle. The idea that sleep had a mentally restorative effect, sorting out and consolidating memories and ideas, was intellectually acceptable by the end of the 19th century. In 'Peter and Wendy', J.M. Barrie wrote 'It is the nightly custom of every good mother after her children are asleep to rummage in their minds and put things straight for next morning, repacking into their proper places the many articles that have wandered during the day....When you wake in the morning, the naughtinesses and evil passions with which you went to bed have been folded up small and placed at the bottom of your mind; and on the top, beautifully aired, are spread out your prettier thoughts, ready for you to put on.' The stories of Peter Pan take place in a fictional world and contain many allusions to aspects of cognitive psychology, some of which predate their formal scientific investigation.

The first semi-multiple-systematic study of the connection between sleep and memory was conducted in 1924 by Jenkins and Dallenbach, for the purpose of testing Hermann Ebbinghaus' memory decay theory. Their results showed that memory retention was much better after a period of sleep compared to the same time interval spent awake. It was not until 1953, however, when sleep was delineated into rapid eye movement sleep and non-rapid eye movement sleep, that studies focusing on the effect of specific sleep stages on memory were conducted. As behavioral characteristics of the effects of sleep and memory are becoming increasingly understood and supported, researchers are turning to the weakly understood neural basis of sleep and memory.

== Sleep cycles ==
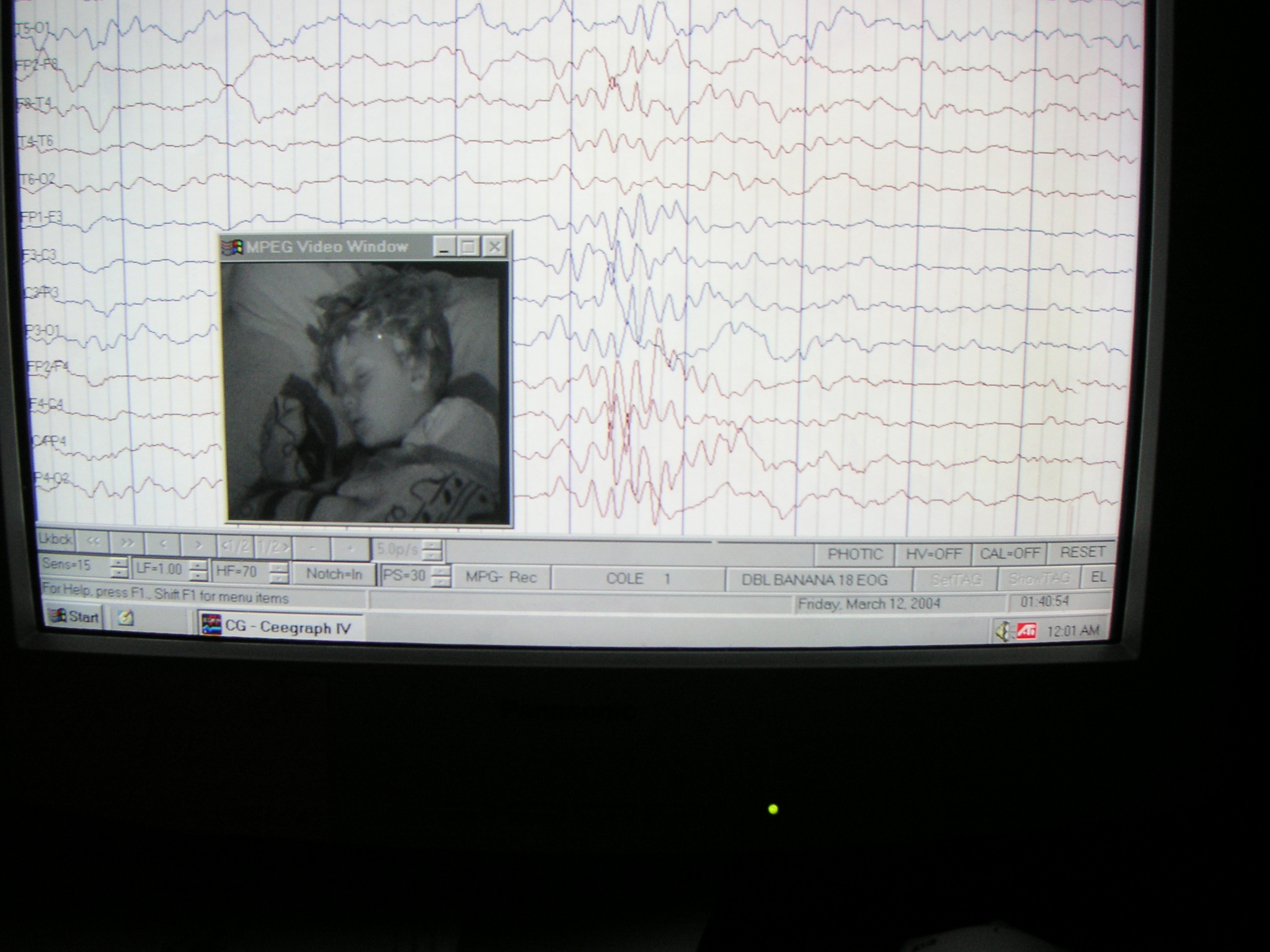
EEG record of brain activity and wave patterns from a sleeping boy.

Sleep progresses in a cycle which consists of five stages. Four of these stages are collectively referred to as non-rapid eye movement (NREM) sleep whereas the last cycle is a rapid eye movement period. A cycle takes approximately 90–110 minutes to complete. Wakefulness is found through an electroencephalogram (EEG) which is measured and characterized by beta waves, the highest in frequency but lowest in amplitude, and tend to move inconsistently due to the vast amount of stimuli a person encounters while awake.

- Pre-sleep is the period of decreased perceptual awareness where brain activity is characterized by alpha waves which are more rhythmic, higher in amplitude and lower in frequency compared to beta waves.
- Stage one is characterized by light sleep and lasts roughly 10 minutes. Brain waves gradually transition to theta waves.
- Stage two also contains theta waves; however, random short bursts of increased frequency called sleep spindles are a defining characteristic of this stage.
- Stage three and four are very similar and together are considered to be "deep sleep". In these stages brain activity transitions to delta waves which are the lowest in frequency and highest in amplitude. These two stages combined are also called slow wave sleep (SWS).
- Stage five, REM sleep, is one of the most interesting stages as brain wave patterns are similar to those seen in relaxed wakefulness. This is referred to as "active sleep" and is the period when most dreaming occurs. REM sleep is also thought to play a role in the cognitive development of infants and children as they spend much more of their sleep in REM periods opposed to adults.

During the first half of the night, the largest portion of sleep is spent as SWS, but as the night progresses SWS stages decrease in length while REM stages increase.

== Memory terms ==
=== Stabilization vs. enhancement ===
Stabilization of a memory is the anchoring of a memory in place, in which a weak connection is established. Stabilization of procedural memories can even occur during waking hours, suggesting that specific non-declarative tasks are enhanced in the absence of sleep. When memories are said to be enhanced, however, the connection is strengthened by rehearsal as well as connecting it to other related memories thereby making the retrieval more efficient. Whereas stabilization of non-declarative memories can be seen to occur during a wakeful state, enhancement of these sensory and motor memories has most been found to occur during nocturnal sleep.

=== Use-dependent processes vs. experience-dependent processes ===
Brain activity that occurs during sleep is assessed in two ways: Use-dependency, and Experience-dependency. Use-dependent brain activity is a result of the neuronal usage that occurred during the previous waking hours. Essentially it is neuronal regeneration, activity that occurs whether the person has learnt anything new or not.

Experience-dependent brain activity is a result of a new situation, environment, or learned task or fact that has taken place in the pre-sleep period. This is the type of brain activity that denotes memory consolidation/enhancement.

It is often hard to distinguish between the two in an experimental setting because the setting alone is a new environment. This new environment would be seen in the sleeping brain activity along with the newly learned task. To avoid this, most experimenters insist participants spend one day in the experimental condition before testing begins so the setting is not novel once the experiment begins. This ensures the collected data for experience-dependent brain activity is purely from the novel task.

=== Consolidation ===
Consolidation of a memory is a process that takes an initially unstable representation and encodes it in a more sturdy, effective and efficient manner. In this new state, the memory is less susceptible to interference. There are essentially three phases of memory consolidation and all are thought to be facilitated by sleep or not sleep:

1. Stabilization is the encoding of a memory which takes only 6 milliseconds.
2. Enhancement is the continual process of consolidation which can occur over minutes, 7 hours, days but not longer. Post-sleep behavioural activities can be seen to show significant improvements in the absence of practice.
3. Integration can also take hours or years and is the process of connecting recently encoded memories into existing memory networks.

=== Reconsolidation ===
Reconsolidation of a memory involves the retrieval of an already consolidated memory (explicit or implicit), into short-term or working memory. Here it is brought into a labile state where subsequent information can interfere with what is currently in memory, therefore altering the memory. This is known as retroactive interference, and is an extremely significant issue for court and eyewitness testimonies.

=== Pre-training vs post-training sleep deprivation ===
Researchers approach the study of sleep and memory from different angles. Some studies measure the effects of sleep deprivation after a novel task is taught (the subject learns the task and is sleep deprived afterwards). This is referred to as post-training sleep deprivation. Conversely, other experiments have been conducted that measure the effects of sleep deprivation before a task has been taught (the subject is sleep-deprived and then learns a task). This is referred to as pre-training sleep deprivation.

=== Offline memory processing ===
This is the processing of memories out of conscious awareness. For example, after someone has been reading a book, their brain continues to process the experience during other activities. This "offline" processing likewise occurs during sleep.

== Methods of measuring memory ==
=== Behavioral measures ===
- A self-ordered pointing task is a task of memory where a participant is presented with a number of images (or words) which are arranged on a display. Several trials are presented, each with a different arrangement and containing some of the previous words or images. The task for the participant is to point to a word or image they had not previously pointed to in other trials.
- In a recency discrimination task participants are shown two trials of image presentation and then a third trial containing a mixture of images from the first and second trial. Their task is to determine whether the image was from the most recent presentation or the previous one.
- In a route retrieval task spatial learning occurs where a participant virtual tours a particular place (such as a town or maze). Participants are asked to virtually tour the same thing at a later time while brain imaging is used to measure activity.
- A paired word associative task consists of two phases. During the first phase (acquisition), the responses of the paired-associate task are learned and become recallable. In the second phase (associative phase), the subject learns to pair each response to a separate stimulus. For example, a visual cue would provide information as to what words must be recalled after the stimulus and words are removed.
- In a mirror tracing task participants are asked to trace several figures as fast and as accurately as possible which they can only see in a mirror. Speed is recorded as well as how much they deviate from the original image (accuracy).
- In the Morris water maze task rats are used to test their spatial learning in two kinds of conditions: spatial and nonspatial. In the spatial condition, a platform is hidden by using murky water and in the nonspatial condition, the platform is visible. The spatial condition the rat must rely on their spatial memory to find the platform whereas the nonspatial condition is used for comparison purposes.

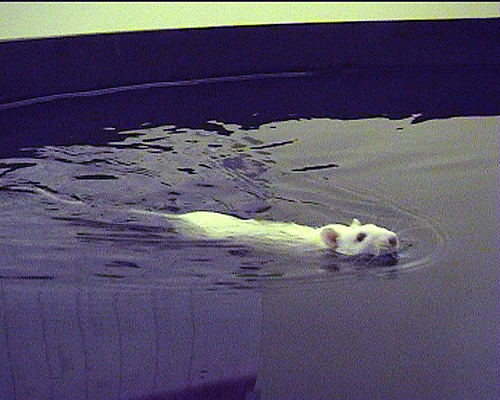
A rat undergoing a Morris water navigation test

- The serial reaction time task (SRT task) is a task whereby subjects face a computer screen where several markers are displayed that are spatially related to relevant markers on their keyboard. The subjects are asked to react as fast and accurately as possible to the appearance of a stimulus below one of the markers. Subjects can be trained on the task with either explicit instructions (e.g. there are colour sequences presented which must be learned) or implicit ones (e.g. the experimenter does not mention colour sequences, thus leaving the subjects to believe that they are taking place in a speed test). When this task is used in sleep studies, after a time delay, subjects are tested for retention.
- In the reach-to-grasp task rodents learned a skilled forelimb task. Sleep improved movement speed with preservation of accuracy. These offline improvements were linked to both replay of task-related ensembles during non-rapid eye movement (NREM) sleep and temporal shifts that more tightly bound motor cortical ensembles to movements.
- In a neuroprosthetic task rodents trained to perform a simple brain–machine interface task in which the activity of a set of motor cortical units was used to control a mechanical arm attached to a feeding spout. After successful learning, task-related units specifically experienced increased locking and coherency to slow-wave activity (SWA) during sleep. The time spent in SWA predicted the performance gains upon awakening.
- In a block tapping task participants are asked to type a sequence of five numbers with their dominant or non-dominant hand (specified in experiment), for an allotted period of time, followed by a rest period. A number of these trials occur and the computer records the number of sequences completed to assess speed and the error rate to assess accuracy.
- A finger tapping test is commonly used when a pure motor task is needed. A finger tapping test requires subjects to continuously press four keys (typically numerical keys) on a keypad with their nondominant hand in a sequence, such as 4-3-1-2-4, for a given amount of time. Testing is done by determining the number of errors made.

=== Neural imaging measures ===
Neuroimaging can be classified into two categories, both used in varying situations depending on what type of information is needed. Structural imaging deals predominately with the structure of the brain (computed tomography) while functional imaging deals more heavily with metabolic processes in regards to anatomical functioning (positron emission tomography, functional magnetic resonance imaging). In recent years, the relationship between sleep and memory processes had been aided by the development of such neuroimaging techniques.

Positron emission tomography (PET) is used in viewing functional processes of the brain (or other body parts). A Positron-emitting radionuclide is injected into the bloodstream and emits gamma rays which are detected by an imaging scanner. Computer analysis then allows for a 3-dimensional reconstruction of the brain region or body part of interest.

Functional magnetic resonance imaging (fMRI) is a type of brain imaging that measures the change of oxygen in the blood due to the activity of neurons. The resulting data can be visualized as a picture of the brain with colored representations of activation.

=== Molecular measures ===
Although this may be seen as similar to neuroimaging techniques, molecular measures help to enhance areas of activation that would otherwise be indecipherable to neuroimaging. One such technique that aids in both the temporal and visual resolution of fMRI is the blood-oxygen-level dependent (BOLD) response. Changes in the BOLD response can be seen when there is differing levels of activation in suspected areas of functioning. Energy is supplied to the brain in the form glucose and oxygen (which is transferred by hemoglobin). The blood supply is consistently regulated so that areas of activation receive higher amounts of energy compared to areas that are less activated. In positron emission tomography, the use of radionuclides (isotopes with short half lives) facilitates visual resolution. These radionuclides are attached to glucose, water and ammonia so that easy absorption into the activated brain areas is accomplished. Once these radioactive tracers are injected into the bloodstream, the efficiency and location of chemical processes can be observed using PET.

== Methods of measuring sleep ==
=== Electrophysiological measures ===
The main method of measuring sleep in humans is polysomnography (PSG). For this method, participants often must come into a lab where researchers can use PSG to measure things such as total sleep time, sleep efficiency, wake after sleep onset, and sleep fragmentation. PSG can monitor various body functions including brain activity (electroencephalography), eye movement (electrooculography), muscle movement (electromyography), and heart rhythm (electrocardiography).

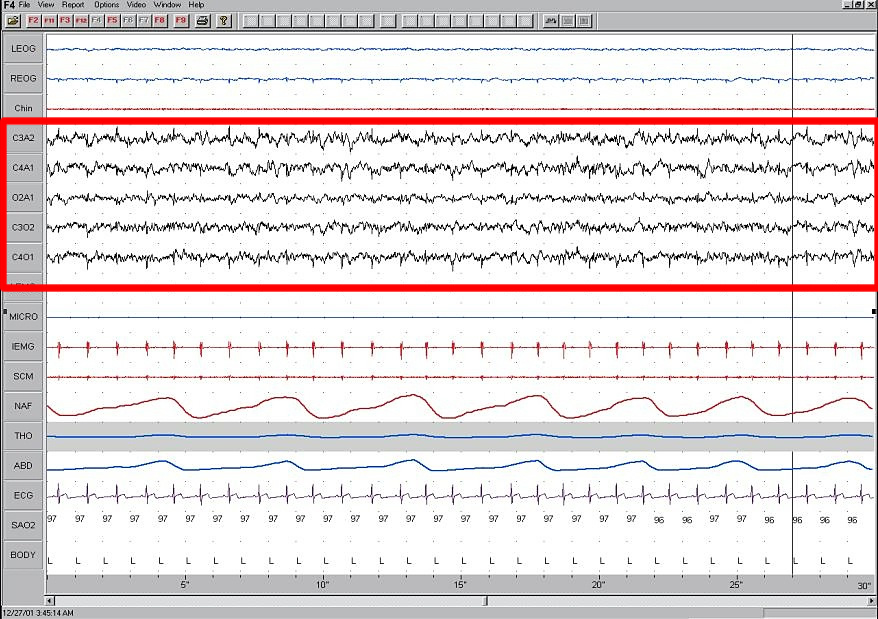
- Brain wave patterns and activity recorded by an electroencephalogram.
  Electroencephalography (EEG) is a procedure that records electrical activity along the scalp. This procedure cannot record activity from individual neurons, but instead measures the overall average electrical activity in the brain.
- Electrooculography (EOG) measures the difference in electrical potential between the front and the back of the eye. This does not measure a response to individual visual stimuli, but instead measures general eye movement.
- Electromyography (EMG) is used to records the electrical activity of skeletal muscles. A device called an electromyograph measures the electrical potential of muscle cells to monitor muscle movement.
- Electrocardiography (ECG or EKG) measures the electrical depolarization of the heart muscles using various electrodes placed near the chest and limbs. This measure of depolarization can be used to monitor heart rhythm.

=== Behavioural measures ===
Actigraphy is a common and minimally invasive way to measure sleep architecture. Actigraphy has only one method of recording, movement. This movement can be analyzed using different actigraphic programs. As such, an actigraph can often be worn similarly to a watch, or around the waist as a belt. Because it is minimally invasive and relatively inexpensive, this method allows for recordings outside of a lab setting and for many days at a time. But, actigraphy often over estimates sleep time (de Souza 2003 and Kanady 2011).

== Competing theories ==
Most studies point to the specific deficits in declarative memories that form pre or post REM sleep deprivation. Conversely, deficits in non-declarative memory occur pre or post NREM sleep deprivation. This is the stage specific enhancement theory. There is also a proposed dual-step memory hypothesis suggesting that optimal learning occurs when the memory trace is initially processed in SWS and then REM sleep. Support for this is shown in many experiments where memory improvement is greater with either SWS or REM sleep compared to sleep deprivation, but memory is even more accurate when the sleep period contains both SWS and REM sleep.

== Declarative memory ==
Declarative memory is the memory for conscious events. There are two types of declarative memory: episodic and semantic. Episodic memory is for remembering experiences or personal facts whereas semantic memory is remembering specific facts. Declarative memory is typically considered to be an explicit memory because the individual must consciously try to remember it.

=== Temporal memory ===
Temporal memory consists of three main categories, although they are still debated by psychologists and neurobiologists; the categories are immediate memory, short-term and long-term memory. Immediate memory is when a memory is recalled based on recently presented information. Short-term memory is what is used when retaining information that had been presented within seconds or minutes prior. A type of short-term memory is known as working memory, which is the ability to retain information that is necessary to carry out sequential actions. Long-term memory is the retention of information for longer periods of time, such as days, weeks or even a lifetime.

In a study, participants were placed into four groups: two control groups given either caffeine or a placebo, and two groups that were sleep deprived for 36 hours, given either caffeine or a placebo. The task used to measure temporal memory consisted of discriminating between recent and less recent face presentations. A set of twelve unfamiliar faces were presented sequentially every 10 seconds. A self-ordered pointing task was used afterwards for 5 minutes to prevent rehearsal and to keep tired participants occupied. This required them to mark any new items seen (either nouns or abstract shapes) presented on 12 sheets. A second set was presented, followed by another self-ordered pointing task, and then a random sequence of 48 faces either containing previously presented faces or new ones were shown to the participant. They were asked if they recognized the faces and whether they were from the first or second set. Results indicate that sleep deprivation does not significantly affect recognition of faces, but does produce a significant impairment of temporal memory (discriminating which face belonged to which set). Caffeine was found to have a greater effect on the sleep deprived group as compared to the placebo group deprived of sleep, but still performed worse than both control groups. Sleep deprivation was also found to increase beliefs of being correct, especially if the participants were wrong. Brain imaging studies of those sleep deprived found that the greatest reduction in metabolic rate is in the prefrontal cortex.

=== Verbal learning ===
A blood-oxygen-level dependent (BOLD) fMRI was used in a study by Drummond et al. to measure the brain's response to verbal learning following sleep deprivation. An fMRI recorded brain activity during a verbal learning task of participants either having a normal night of sleep or those deprived of 34.7 (± 1.2) hours of sleep. The task alternated between a baseline condition of determining whether nouns were upper or lower case, and an experimental condition of memorizing a list of nouns. The results of the study indicate that performance is significantly worse on free recall of the list of nouns when sleep deprived (an average of 2.8 ± 2 words) compared to having a normal night of sleep (4.7 ± 4 words). In terms of brain regions activated, the left prefrontal cortex, premotor cortex, and temporal lobes were found to be activated during the task in the rested state, and discrete regions of the prefrontal cortex were even more activated during the task in the sleep deprived state. As well, the bilateral parietal lobe, left middle frontal gyrus, and right inferior frontal gyrus were found to be activated for those sleep deprived. The implication of these findings are that the brain can initially compensate for the effects of sleep deprivation while maintaining partially intact performance, which declines with an increasing time-on-task. This initial compensation may be found in the bilateral regions of both frontal and parietal lobes and the activation of the prefrontal cortex is significantly correlated with sleepiness.

=== Cognitive performance ===
Cerebral activation during performance on three cognitive tasks (verbal learning, arithmetic, and divided attention) were compared after both normal sleep and 35 hours of total sleep deprivation (TSD) in a study by Drummond and Brown. Use of fMRI measured these differences in the brain. In the verbal learning task, fMRI indicated the regions involved in both verbal learning and memorization. The results found that both TSD and a normal night of sleep showed a significant response in the prefrontal cortex, and following TSD displayed a response of additional areas which included other prefrontal areas, bilateral inferior parietal lobule and superior parietal lobes. Increases in sleepiness also correlated with activation of two ventral prefrontal regions and a correlation between a greater activation in bilateral parietal lobes (which include language areas) and lower levels of impairment on free recall were also found following TSD. In the arithmetic task, normal sleep showed the expected activation in the bilateral prefrontal and parietal working memory regions, but following TSD only showed activation in the left superior parietal lobe and the left premotor cortex in response, with no new areas to compensate (as was found in verbal learning). Increased sleepiness was also correlated with activation in a ventral prefrontal region, but only one region. The divided attention task combined both verbal learning and the arithmetic task. fMRI indicated that cerebral response after TSD is similar to that of the verbal learning task (specifically the right prefrontal cortex, bilateral parietal lobes, and cingulate gyrus showing the strongest response). The implication of this finding is that additional brain regions activated after both verbal learning and divided attention tasks following TSD represent a cerebral compensatory response to lacking sleep. For example, there is a decline in response of the left temporal lobes during both tasks which is involved in different learning tasks during a rested state, but involvement of the left inferior parietal lobe in short-term verbal memory storage following TSD suggests that this region might compensate. No new areas for the arithmetic task may suggest that it relies heavily on working memory so compensation is not possible, in comparison to tasks such as verbal learning which rely less on working memory.

=== Slow wave sleep (SWS) ===
Slow wave sleep (SWS) has often been associated with successful performance in declarative memory recall tasks. For example, declarative and procedural memory recall tasks applied over early and late nocturnal sleep, as well as wakefulness controlled conditions, have been shown that declarative memory improves more during early sleep (dominated by SWS) while procedural memory during late sleep (dominated by REM sleep). Based on targeted memory reactivation (TMR) that use associated memory cues for triggering memory traces during sleep, recent studies have been reassuring the importance of nocturnal SWS for the formation of persistent memories in neocortical networks, as well as highlighting the possibility of increasing people's memory performance at declarative recalls. Increased slow activity and sleep time spent in SWS have been also related to better performance in implicit learning.

==== Macroscopic brain systems ====
The most prominent population pattern in the hippocampus during nREM sleep is called sharp wave ripples (SPW-Rs). SPW-Rs are the most synchronous neuronal patterns in the mammalian brain. As many as 15-30 percent of neurons can fire synchronously in 50-200 ms within the CA3-CA2-CA1 regions, the subicular complex, and the entorhinal cortex during SPW-Rs (as opposed to ~1 percent during active waking and REM sleep). Neurons within SPW-Rs are sequentially organized, and many of these fast sequences relate to the order of neuronal firing during the animal's pre-sleep experience. For example, when a rat explores a maze, place cell sequences in different arms of the maze are replayed in either forward (as during the experience itself) or reverse order, but compressed in time several-fold. SPW-Rs are temporally linked to both sleep spindles and the slow oscillations of the neocortex. Interfering with SPW-Rs or their coupling with neocortical slow oscillations results in memory impairment, which can be as severe as surgically damaging the hippocampus and/or associated structures. SPW-Rs are therefore the most prominent physiological biomarkers of episodic (i.e., hippocampus-dependent) memory consolidation (Buzsáki 2015).

==== Neural forebrain reverberation correlation ====
Researchers used rats in order to investigate the effects of novel tactile objects on the long-term evolution of the major rodent forebrain loops essential in species-specific behaviours, including such structures as the hippocampus, putamen, neocortex and the thalamus. The rats were monitored but not bothered for 48–96 hours, allowing normal wake-sleep cycles to occur. At some point four novel tactile objects were placed in the four corners of the rat's cage. They were all very different from one another and they were there for a total of one hour. The brain activity during this hour was used as a baseline or template to compare. Data analysis implied that the neural assemblies during SWS correlated significantly more with templates than during waking hours or REM sleep. As well, these post-learning, post-SWS reverberations lasted 48 hours, much longer than the duration of novel object learning (one hour), indicating long term potentiation. Further analysis on a neuron to neuron base showed no subset of neurons (brain structure) to be responsible for the reverberations or anti-reverberations (patterns of activity significantly more dissimilar than novel stimulation templates). Another difference noticed was the highest correlation peaks in SWS corresponded with the lowest rate of neuron firing in the forebrain, opposite that of REM sleep and waking where rate of firing is the highest. It is hypothesized that this is due to interference from other incoming stimuli during waking periods. In SWS there is no incoming stimuli, so the novel experience can be replayed, without interruption.

===== Neural hippocampal reverberation correlations =====
A study by Peigneux et al., (2004) noted that the firing sequences in the hippocampal ensembles during spatial learning are also active during sleep, which shows that post training sleep has a role in processing spatial memories. This study was done to prove that the same hippocampal areas are activated in humans during route learning in a virtual town, and are reactivated during subsequent slow wave sleep (SWS). In order to monitor this activation, experimenters used PET scans and fMRI to use cerebral blood flow as a marker of synaptic activity. The finding noted that the amount of hippocampal activation during slow-wave sleep positively correlated to the improvement on the virtual tour task the following day, which indicates that hippocampal activity during sleep correlates with the improvement in memory performance. These findings prove that learning-dependent modulation in hippocampal activity while sleeping shows processing of the previously learned episodic and spatial memory traces. This modulation of the hippocampus leads to plastic changes in the brain and ultimately an improvement in performance. The results of this study showed that spatial memory traces are processed in humans while they are in NREM sleep. It showed a reaction of the hippocampal formation during SWS, after a declarative spatial memory task. Experimenters also found, that in humans, there is experience-dependent modulation of activity during NREM sleep in the hippocampal regions, but not during REM sleep after learning. The evidence from this study was substantial to its hypothesis that the information learned while awake is altered, and strengthened while humans are sleeping.

Based on the active system consolidation hypothesis, repeated reactivations of newly encoded information in hippocampus during slow oscillations in NREM sleep mediate the stabilization and gradual integration of declarative memory with pre-existing knowledge networks on the cortical level. It assumes the hippocampus might hold information only temporarily and in fast-learning rate, whereas the neocortex is related to long-term storage and slow-learning rate. This dialogue between hippocampus and neocortex occurs in parallel with hippocampal sharp-wave ripples and thalamo-cortical spindles, synchrony that drives the formation of spindle-ripple event which seems to be a prerequisite for the formation of long-term memories.

==== Decreases in acetylcholine ====
In this study, two groups of participants took part in a two-night counterbalanced study. Two tasks were learned by all participants between 10:00-10:30pm. The declarative task was a paired-associate word list of 40 German semantically related word pairs. The non-declarative task was a mirror-tracing task. At 11:00pm all participants were put on a two-hour infusion of either physostigmine or a placebo. Physostigmine is an acetylcholinesterase inhibitor; it is a drug that inhibits the breakdown of the inhibitory neurotransmitter acetylcholine, thereby allowing it to remain active longer in the synapses. The sleep group was put to bed while the other group stayed awake. Testing of both tasks took place at 2:45am, 30 minutes after the sleep group had been woken up; a sleep which had been rich in slow-wave sleep (SWS). Results showed that the increased ACh negatively affected recall memory (declarative task), in the sleep condition compared to participants given the placebo. Specifically, recall after sleep for the placebo group showed an increase of 5.2 ± 0.8 words compared to an increase of only 2.1 ± 0.6 words when participants were given the acetylcholinesterase inhibitor. Conversely, neither speed nor accuracy declined in the non-declarative mirror task when participants were given physostigmine, and neither task performance was affected in the wake groups when physostigmine was administered. This suggests that the purpose of ACh suppression during SWS allows for hippocampus-dependent declarative memory consolidation; high levels of ACh during SWS blocks memory replay on a hippocampal level.

- Note: There was no correlation between the amount of SWS and level of recall. Memory consolidation can be disrupted, however, if large parts of SWS are missing.

==== Increases in sleep spindles ====
A typical EEG during stage 2 sleep

Sleep spindles are short and intense bursts of neurons firing in sync, occurring in the thalamo-cortical networks. These peak late in the night and are defining characteristics of stage two sleep. Sleep spindles are thought to aid in information consolidation during sleep and have been shown to increase after training on a motor task. A recent meta-review of 53 studies concluded "there is no relationship between sleep spindles and memory, and thus it is unlikely that sleep spindles are indeed generally implicated in learning and plasticity".

A study using 49 rats indicated the increase of sleep spindles during slow-wave sleep following learning. It gave evidence to the increase of spindle frequency during non-REM sleep following paired associate of motor-skill learning tasks. Using an EEG, sleep spindles were detected and shown to be present only during slow-wave sleep. Beginning with a preliminary study, rats underwent six hours of monitored sleep, after a period of learning. Results showed that during the first hour following learning, there was the most evident effect on learning-modulated sleep spindle density. However, this increase in spindle density was not dependent on the training condition. In other words, there was an increase in spindles regardless of how the rats were trained. EEG patterns showed a significant difference in the density of sleep spindles compared to the density of a control group of rats, who did not undergo any training before their sleep spindles were measured. This effect of increased spindle density only lasted for the first hour into sleep following training, and then disappeared within the second hour into sleep.

=== Reward learning and memory ===
In a study by Fischer and Born, 2009, previous knowledge of monetary reward and post-training sleep are proven to be significant predictors of overall finger sequence tapping performance. Subjects were presented with two different finger sequence tasks that would have to be replicated at a later time. The subjects were told that there would be a reward offered for improvement upon a specific finger tapping sequence task. A control group was not given any knowledge of a reward. The subjects were separated further by allowing a sleep period between initial training and final testing for one group while another group faced a wake retention interval. It was concluded that the group that received both information about reward as well as being able to sleep displayed the highest increase in performance on both finger tapping sequences. Knowledge of reward without sleep and sleep without knowledge of reward were both significant contributors to improved performance. In all cases sleep was determined to have an advantageous effect on overall performance when compared to groups that underwent a twelve-hour wake retention period.

== Non-declarative memory ==
Non-declarative memory is memory gained from previous experiences that is unconsciously applied to everyday scenarios. Non-declarative memory is essential for the performance of learned skills and habits, for example, running or cooking a favourite meal. There are three types of non-declarative memories: implicit memory (unconscious memory, priming), instrumental memory (classical conditioning), and procedural memory (automatic skill memory).

=== Sleep deprivation ===
==== ERK phosphorylation ====
Extracellular signal-related kinases, also known as classical MAP kinase, are a group of protein kinases located in neurons. These proteins are activated or deactivated by phosphorylation (adding of a phosphate group using ATP), in response to neurotransmitters and growth factors. This can result in subsequent protein to protein interactions and signal transductions (neurotransmitters or hormones transmit to cells), which ultimately controls all cellular processes including gene transcription and cell cycles (important in learning and memory). A study tested four groups of rats in the Morris Water Maze, two groups in the spatial task (hidden platform) and two groups in the non-spatial task (visible platform.) The effects of six hours of total sleep deprivation (TSD) were assessed for the experimental group (one spatial group, one non-spatial group) in both tasks. Six hours after the TSD period (or sleep period for controls), the groups of rats were trained on either task then tested 24 hours later. In addition, the levels of total ERK phosphorylation (ERK 1 and ERK 2), protein phosphate 1 (PP1), and MAPK phosphatase 2 (latter two both involved in dephosphorylation) were assessed by decapitating four other groups of mice, (two sleep deprived and two non-sleep deprived), and removing their hippocampuses after the six hours of TSD, or two hours after TSD (eight hours total). Results showed that TSD did not impair learning of the spatial task, but it did impair memory. With regards to the non-spatial task, learning again was no different in the TSD; however, memory in the TSD group was actually slightly better, although not quite significantly. Analysis of the hippocampus showed that TSD significantly decreased the levels of total ERK phosphorylation by about 30%. TSD did not affect proteins in the cortex which indicates that the decreases in ERK levels were due to impaired signal transduction in the hippocampus. In addition, neither PP1 or MAPK phosphatase 2 levels were increased suggesting that the decreases in ERK were not due to dephosphorylation but instead a result of TSD. Therefore, it is proposed that TSD has aversive effects on the cellular processes (ERK: gene transcription etc.), underlying sleep-dependent memory plasticity.

=== REM sleep ===
REM sleep is known for its vivid creations and similarity to the bioelectric outputs of a waking person. This stage of sleep is characterized by muscle atonia, fast but low voltage EEG and, as the name suggests, rapid eye movement. It is difficult to attribute memory gains to a single stage of sleep when it may be the entire sleep cycle that is responsible for memory consolidation. Recent research conducted by Datta et al. used an avoidance task followed by a post-training REM sleep period to examine changes in P waves affecting reprocessing of recently acquired stimuli. It was found that not only were the P waves increased during post-training sleep but also the density of the waves. These findings may imply that P waves during REM sleep may help to activate critical forebrain and cortical structures dealing with memory consolidation. In a Hennevin et al. study, 1989, the mesencephalic reticular formation (MRF) was given light electrical stimulation, during REM sleep, which is known to have an advantageous effect for learning when applied after training. The rats in the experiment were trained to run a maze in search of a food reward. One group of rats was given non-awakening MRF electrical stimulations after each of their maze trials compared to a control group which did not receive any electrical stimulation. It was noticed that the stimulated rats performed significantly better in respect to error reduction. These findings imply that dynamic memory processes occur both during training as well as during post-training sleep. Another study by Hennevin et al. (1998) conditioned rats to fear a noise that is associated with a subsequent foot shock. The interesting part of the experiment is that fear responding to the noise (measured in the amygdala) was observed when the noise was presented during REM sleep. This was compared to a group of pseudo-conditioned rats who did not display the same amygdalar activation during post-training sleep. This would suggest that neural responding to previously salient stimuli is maintained even during REM sleep. There is no shortage of research conducted on the effects that REM sleep has on the working brain, but consistency in the findings is what plagues recent research. There is no guarantee as to what functions REM sleep may perform for our bodies and brains, but modern research is always expanding and assimilating new ideas to further our understanding of such processes.

==== PGO waves ====
In animals, the appearance of ponto-geniculo-occipital waves (PGO waves) is related to that of the bioelectric outputs of rapid eye movements. These waves are most clearly seen during the transition from non-REM to REM sleep. Although these phasic waves are observed in many portions of the animal brain, they are most noticeable in the pons, lateral geniculate bodies, and the occipital cortex. Peigneux et al., 2006, reported that the lateral geniculate nucleus and occipital cortex display higher levels of activity during REM sleep than during wakefulness. This would add to the theory that activation in these areas is similar to PGO wave activation in animals. Pontine waves are commonly seen in animals as a mechanism to help facilitate learning and memory consolidation. An improvement on task performance was seen to be a result of increased P waves between REM sleep sessions. In a study using post learning REM sleep deprivation the effects of stimulating the P wave generator (located in the pontine tegmentum) of a rat were observed. Two groups of rats underwent an avoidance learning task and then allowed a sleep period while another group of rats were deprived sleep. When comparing the two groups the sleep deprived rats showed a significant deficit in learning from having not undergone REM sleep. In another rat group, the P wave generator was stimulated using a carbachol injection and the rats then underwent a sleep deprivation stage. When these rats were again tested on their learning it was shown that activation of the P wave generator during sleep deprivation resulted in normal learning being achieved. This would point to the fact that the activation of P waves, even without REM sleep, was enough to enhance the memory processes that would not normally have happened.

==== Implicit face memory ====
Faces are an important part of one's social life. To be able to recognize, respond and act towards a person requires unconscious memory encoding and retrieval processes. Facial stimuli are processed in the fusiform gyrus (occipito-temporal brain area) and this processing is an implicit function representing a typical form of implicit memory. REM sleep has been seen to be more beneficial to implicit visuospatial memory processes, rather than slow-wave sleep which is crucial for explicit memory consolidation. REM sleep is known for its visual experiences, which may often include detailed depictions of the human countenance. A recognition task was used to gauge familiarity with a previously shown sequence of faces after a subsequent period of REM sleep. It was seen that the fusiform gyrus was active during training, the REM sleep period, and the recognition task as well. It is hypothesized that brain mechanisms during REM sleep, as well as pure repetition priming, can account for the implicit recognition of the previously shown faces.

==== Macroscopic brain systems ====
Previous research has shown REM sleep to reactivate cortical neural assemblies post-training on a serial reaction time task (SRT), in other words REM sleep replays the processing that occurred while one learnt an implicit task in the previous waking hours. However, control subjects did not complete a SRT task, thus researchers could not assume the reactivation of certain networks to be a result of the implicitly learned sequence/grammar as it could simply be due to elementary visuomotor processing which was obtained in both groups. To answer this question the experiment was redone and another group was added who also took part in the SRT task. They experienced no sequence to the SRT task (random group), whereas the experimental group did experience a sequence (probabilistic group), although without conscious awareness. Results of PET scans indicate that bilateral cuneus were significantly more activated during SRT practice as well as post-training REM sleep in the Probabilistic group than the Random group. In addition, this activation was significantly increased during REM sleep versus the SRT task. This suggests that specific brain regions are specifically engaged in the post-processing of sequential information. This is further supported by the fact that regional CBF (rCBF) during post-training REM sleep are modulated by the level of high-order, but not low-order learning obtained prior to sleep. Therefore, brain regions that take part in a learning process are modulated by both the sequential structure of the learned material (increased activation in cuneus), and the amount of high-order learning (rCBF).

==== REM sleep deprivation and neurotrophic factors ====
The effects of REM sleep deprivation (RSD) on neurotrophic factors, specifically nerve growth factor (NGF) and brain-derived neurotrophic factor (BDNF), were assessed in 2000 by Sie et al. Neurotrophins are proteins found in the brain and periphery that aid in the survival, functioning and generation of neurons; this is an important element in the synaptic plasticity process, the underlying neurochemical foundation in forming memories. Sei et al., inserted electrodes into the skulls of seven pairs of rats to measure electroencephalogram (EEG), and inserted wires into the neck muscles of the rats to measure electromyogram (EMG), a technique used to measure the amount of muscle activity. Half the rats experienced a six-hour REM sleep deprivation period, while the other half experienced a six-hour sleep period, containing all sleep cycles. Results showed that the rats in the REM sleep deprivation group experienced decreased levels of brain-derived neurotrophic factor in the cerebellum (coordination, motor learning) and brainstem (sensory and motor ascending pathway); conversely, the hippocampus (long-term memory, spatial navigation), showed decreases in nerve growth factor levels. BDNF protein has been shown to be necessary for procedural learning (form of non-declarative memory). Since procedural learning has also exhibited consolidation and enhancement under REM sleep, it is proposed that the impairment of procedural learning tasks is due to the lack of BDNF proteins in the cerebellum and brainstem during RSD. In regards to NGF, the basal forebrain (production and distribution of AcH in the brain), more specifically the medial septal area, sends cholinergic (excitatory in hippocampus) and GABAergic (inhibitory) neurotransmitters through fibres to the hippocampus target cells. These target cells then secrete NGF which plays a key role in the physiological state of the hippocampus and its functions. It has been noted that REM sleep increases the secretion of NGF, therefore it has been proposed that during RSD cholinergic activity decreases leading to a decrease in NGF and impairment in procedural learning.

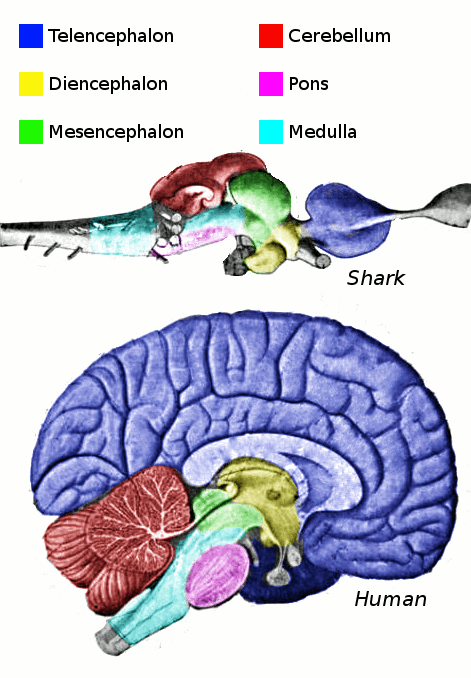
Vertebrate brain regions

=== Macroscopic brain system reorganization ===
Walker and Stickgold hypothesized that after initial memory acquisition, sleep reorganizes memory representation at a macro-brain systems level. Their experiment consisted of two groups; the night-sleep group was taught a motor sequence block tapping task at night, put to sleep and then retested 12 hours later. The day-wake group was taught the same task in the morning and tested 12 hours later with no intervening sleep. FMRI was used to measure brain activity during retest. Results indicated significantly fewer errors/sequence in the night-sleep group compared to the day wake group. FMRI output for the night-sleep group indicated increased activation in the right primary motor cortex/M1/Prefrontal Gyrus (contra lateral to the hand they were block tapping with), right anterior medial prefrontal lobe, right hippocampus (long-term memory, spatial memory), right ventral striatum (olfactory tubercle, nucleus accumbens), as well as regions of the cerebellum (lobules V1, V11). In the day-wake group, fMRI showed "decreased" signal activation bilaterally in the parietal cortices (integrates multiple modalities), in addition to the left insular cortex (regulation of homeostasis), left temporal pole (most anterior of temporal cortex), and the left inferior fronto-polar cortex. Previous investigations have shown that signal increases indicate brain plasticity. The increased signal activity seen in M1 after sleep corresponds to increased activity in this area seen during practice; however, an individual must practice for longer periods than they would have to sleep in order to obtain the same level of M1 signal increases. Therefore, it is suggested that sleep enhances the cortical representation of motor tasks by brain system expansion, as seen by increased signal activity.

=== Working memory ===
Considered to be a mental workspace enabling temporary storage and retrieval of information, working memory is crucial to problem-solving and analysis of different situations. Working memory capacity is a measure of the number of mental processing functions one is able to perform consecutively. Increases in one's working memory capacity can be accomplished with a strategy known as chunking. Aritake et al. conducted a finger sequence tapping experiment in which the subjects were shown coloured dots in sequence on a monitor corresponding to buttons on their keyboard. When a colour was shown, the subject had to react by pressing the right colour on the keyboard. The subjects were separated into three groups. Group one continually trained with no periods of sleep. Group two was trained and retested over ten hours of wakefulness followed by eight hours of sleep and final testing. The third group was trained at ten pm, followed by an eight-hour sleep. This group was then tested the following morning and again later in the same day. Results showed that wakefulness was an insignificant predictor of performance improvement, unless followed by a period of sleep. Groups that were allowed a post training sleep period, regardless of its time in reference to training, experienced improvements in learning the finger tapping sequences. The initial working memory capacity of the groups averaged three to four units. In groups two and three, the working memory capacity was increased to an average of 5–6 units. It was proposed that sleep-dependent improvements may contribute to overall improvement in working memory capacity, leading to improved fluid intelligence.

==== Sleep deprivation ====
Sleep deprivation, whether it is total sleep deprivation or partial sleep deprivation, can impair working memory in measures of memory, speed of cognitive processing, attention and task switching. Casement et al. found that when subjects were asked to recognize digits displayed on a screen by typing them on a keypad, the working memory speed of subjects whose sleep was restricted to four hours a night (approximately 50% of their normal sleep amount) were 58% slower than control groups who were allowed their full eight hours of sleep.

== Synaptic plasticity ==
The brain is an ever-changing, plastic, model of information sharing and processing. In order for the brain to incorporate new experiences into a refined schema, it has to undergo specific modifications to consolidate and assimilate all new information. Synaptic plasticity can be described as the changing in strength between two related neurons. Neuroplasticity is most clearly seen in the instances of REM sleep deprivation during brain maturation. Regional brain measurements in neonatal REM sleep deprived rats displayed a significant size reduction in areas such as the cerebral cortex and the brain stem. The rats were deprived during critical periods after birth, and subsequently anatomical size reduction is observed. Using a pursuit task (used to test visuomotor capabilities) in combination with an fMRI, Maquet et al., 2003, found that increases in activation were seen in the supplementary eye field and right dentate nucleus of subjects who were allowed to sleep as compared to sleep deprived individuals. The right superior temporal sulcus was also noticed to have higher activation levels. When functional connectivity was analyzed it was found that the dentate nucleus was more closely involved with the functions of the superior temporal sulcus. The results suggest that performance on the pursuit task relies on the subject's ability to comprehend appropriate movement patterns in order to recreate the optimal movements. Sleep deprivation was found to interrupt the slow processes that lead to learning of this procedural skill and alter connectivity changes that would have normally been seen after a night of rest. Neuroplasticity has been thoroughly researched over the past few decades and results have shown that significant changes that occur in our cortical processing areas have the power to modulate neuronal firing to both new and previously experienced stimuli.

=== Neurotransmitter regulation ===
The changes in quantity of a certain neurotransmitter as well as how the post-synaptic terminal responds to this change are underlying mechanisms of brain plasticity. During sleep there are remarkable changes in modulatory neurotransmitters throughout the brain. Acetylcholine is an excitatory neurotransmitter that is seen to increase to near waking levels during REM sleep while compared to lower levels during slow-wave sleep. Evidence has shown that functioning of the hippocampus-dependent memory system (episodic memory and autobiographical memory) is directly affected by cholinergic changes throughout the wake-sleep cycle. High levels of ACh would promote information attained during wakefulness to be stored in the hippocampus. This is accomplished by suppressing previous excitatory connections while facilitating encoding without interference from previously stored information. During NREM sleep, and especially slow-wave sleep, low levels of Ach would cause the release of this suppression and allow for spontaneous recovery of hippocampal neurons resulting in the facilitation of memory consolidation.

=== Gene expression ===
Recently, approximately one hundred genes whose brain expression is increased during periods of sleep have been found. A similar number of genes were found to promote gene expression during wakefulness. These sets of genes are related to different functional groups which may promote different cellular processes. The genes expressed during wakefulness may perform numerous duties including energy allocation, synaptic excitatory neurotransmission, high transcriptional activity and synaptic potentiation in learning of new information. There was a sleep related increase in processes that involve the synthesis and maintenance of the synapse. Such processes include membrane trafficking, synaptic vesicle recycling, myelin structural protein formation, and cholesterol and protein synthesis. In a different study it was found that there was a sleep related increase in calmodulin-dependent protein kinase IV that has been specifically involved in synaptic depression and in the consolidation of long-term memory. These findings encourage an association between sleep and different aspects of neural plasticity.

Sleep additionally plays a role in memory consolidation via synaptic-level shifts in brain activity. The synaptic homeostasis hypothesis suggests that learning during consciousness induces complete synaptic strengthening, while slow-wave NREM (non-rapid eye movement) re-establishes synaptic strength. This downsizing can potentially stabilize the essential memory trace and restore the capacity of the brain for incoming learning and information

Recordings from previous experiments demonstrate that sleep reorganizes and restructures neural firing sequences and synaptic potency in the hippocampus. When asleep, hippocampal neurons shift their firing patterns and adjust synaptic strengths in ways that support the consolidation and synthesis of new information.

== Alternative sleep schedules ==
=== Motor skills learning ===
The impact of daytime naps was looked at by Walker and Stickgold (2005). The experimental group was given a 60-90 minute afternoon nap (one full cycle), after a motor skills task learned that morning, while the control group received no nap. The nap group improved 16% when tested after their nap, while the no-nap group made no significant improvements. However, it seemed to all even out after that same night's sleep; the no-nap group improved 24% and the nap group improved only 7% more for a total of 23%, virtually identical. With regards to motor skills learning, naps seem to only speed up skill enhancement, not increase the amount of enhancement.

=== Visuals skills learning ===
Much like motor skills learning, visual skills learning increased after a daytime nap period. Researchers Mednick and colleagues have shown that if a visual skills task (find task) is taught in the morning and repeatedly tested throughout the day, individuals will actually become worse at the task. The individuals that were allowed a 30-60 minute nap seemed to gain stabilization of the skill, as no deterioration occurred. If allowed a 60-90 minute nap (REM sleep and slow-wave sleep), individuals displayed enhancement. Unlike the motor task, enhancement was not suppressed during the nocturnal sleep if the individual had napped earlier. In the situation of visual skill learning, naps have been shown to prevent wakeful deterioration and even enhance learning above and beyond enhancement occurring in nocturnal sleep.

=== Shift workers ===
Shift workers who work throughout the night have been known to have far more accidents as opposed to daytime workers. This can be attributed to several factors, including fewer staff and fatigue; however, part of the problem may be the workers' poor working memory and poor performance skills due to poor memory consolidation. Both implicitly learned tasks and explicitly learned tasks improve by roughly 20% after a full nights sleep. Without an adequate nights sleep between learning a new task and performance of that task, performance fails to improve. Shift workers who are not given an adequate amount of sleep, particularly in the NREM stage, between learning and performance of a task will not perform as well as workers who maintain a standard sleep routine.

== Sleep and aging ==
Sleep often becomes deregulated in the elderly, a problem which can lead to or exacerbate pre-existing memory decline. Sleep quality between ages 50 to 70 significantly predicts cognitive functions.

=== Healthy older adults ===
The positive correlation between sleep and memory breaks down with aging. In general, older adults suffer from decreased sleep efficiency. The amount of time and density of REM sleep and slow wave sleep (SWS) decreases with age. Consequently, it is common that the elderly receive no increase in memory after a period of rest. With age, sleep appears to lose its cognitive benefits. Younger adults, around 19- and 20-years old show a strong positive correlation between SWS and memory retention, but older adults around 70- and 71-years old show no positive correlation between SWS and memory. Additionally, older adults demonstrated a negative correlation between SWS and new learning. Older adults show less activation in the hippocampal during SWS, weakening memory consolidation.

To combat this, donepezil has been tested in healthy elderly patients where it was shown to increase time spent in REM sleep and improve following day memory recall. Donepezil was shown to enhance cholinergic activity, increasing REM density (more eye movement and faster entry to REM sleep) and supporting overnight memory consolidation.

By age 50, sleep quality begins to impact brain functioning. Poor sleep quality has been linked to decrease cognitive functions such as executive abilities; the strongest impairment is seen around age 62. Crystallized cognition and skills related to language and accumulated knowledge show sensitivity to sleep quality between ages 66 and 70, suggesting a sensitive age window between ages 50 to 70.

=== Alzheimer's disease ===
Alzheimers disease is thought to be caused by the abnormal buildup of proteins around brain cells which disrupt the activity of neurotransmitters. Patients with Alzheimer's disease experience more sleep disruption than the healthy elderly. Studies have shown that in patients with Alzheimer's disease, there is a decrease in fast spindles. It has also been reported that spindle density the night before a memory test correlates positively with accuracy on an immediate recall task. A positive correlation between time spent in SWS and next day autobiographical memory recall has also been reported in Alzheimer's patients.

== See also ==
- Effects of sleep deprivation on cognitive performance
- Emotion and memory
- Memory and aging
- Memory and social interactions
- Memory improvement
- Sleep study
- Biphasic and polyphasic sleep
