= Procedural memory =

Unconscious memory used to perform tasks

Procedural memory is a type of implicit memory (unconscious, long-term memory) which aids the performance of particular types of tasks without conscious awareness of these previous experiences.

Procedural memory guides the processes we perform, and most frequently resides below the level of conscious awareness. When needed, procedural memories are automatically retrieved and utilized for execution of the integrated procedures involved in both cognitive and motor skills, from tying shoes, to reading, to flying an airplane. Procedural memories are accessed and used without the need for conscious control or attention.

Procedural memory is created through procedural learning, or repeating a complex activity over and over again until all of the relevant neural systems work together to automatically produce the activity. Implicit procedural learning is essential for the development of any motor skill or cognitive activity.

== History ==
The difference between procedural and declarative memory systems were first explored and understood with simple semantics. Psychologists and philosophers began writing about memory over two centuries ago. "Mechanical memory" was first noted in 1804 by Maine de Biran. William James, within his famous book: The Principles of Psychology (1890), suggested that there was a difference between memory and habit. Cognitive psychology disregarded the influence of learning on memory systems in its early years, and this greatly limited the research conducted in procedural learning up until the 20th century. The turn of the century brought a clearer understanding of the functions and structures involved in procedural memory acquisition, storage, and retrieval processes.

McDougall (1923) first made the distinction between explicit and implicit memory. In the 1970s procedural and declarative knowledge was distinguished in literature on artificial intelligence. Studies in the 1970s divided and moved towards two areas of work: one focusing on animal studies and the other to amnesic patients. The first convincing experimental evidence for a dissociation between declarative memory ("knowing what") and non-declarative or procedural ("knowing how") memory was from Milner (1962), by demonstrating that a severely amnesic patient, Henry Molaison, formerly known as patient H.M., could learn a hand–eye coordination skill (mirror drawing) in the absence of any memory of having practiced the task before. Although this finding indicated that memory was not made up of a single system positioned in one place in the brain, at the time, others agreed that motor skills are likely a special case that represented a less cognitive form of memory. However, by refining and improving experimental measures, there has been extensive research using amnesic patients with varying locations and degrees of structural damage. Increased work with amnesic patients led to the finding that they were able to retain and learn tasks other than motor skills. However, these findings had shortcomings in how they were perceived as amnesic patients sometimes fell short on normal levels of performance and therefore amnesia was viewed as strictly a retrieval deficit. Further studies with amnesic patients found a larger domain of normally functioning memory for skill abilities. For example, using a mirror reading task, amnesic patients showed performance at a normal rate, even though they are unable to remember some of the words that they were reading. In the 1980s much was discovered about the anatomy physiology of the mechanisms involved in procedural memory. The cerebellum, hippocampus, neostriatum, and basal ganglia were identified as being involved in memory acquisition tasks.

== Working memory ==
Models of working memory primarily focused on declarative memory until Oberauer suggested that declarative and procedural memory may be processed differently in working memory. The working memory model is thought to be divided into two subcomponents; one is responsible for declarative, while the other represents procedural memory. These two subsections are considered to be largely independent of each other. It has also been determined that the process for selection may be very similar in nature when considering either modality of working memory.

== Acquisition of skill ==
The acquisition of skill requires practice. Merely repeating a task alone, however, does not ensure the acquisition of a skill. Skill acquisition is achieved when an observed behaviour has changed due to experience or practice. This is known as learning and is not directly observable. The information processing model, which incorporates this idea of experience, proposes that skills develop from the interaction of four components central to information processing. These components include: processing speed, the rate at which information is processed in our processing system; breadth of declarative knowledge, the size of an individual's factual information store; breadth of procedural skill, the ability to perform the actual skill; and processing capacity, synonymous with working memory. The processing capacity is of importance to procedural memory because through the process of proceduralization an individual stores procedural memory. This improves skill usage by linking environmental cues with appropriate responses.

One model for understanding skill acquisition was proposed by Fitts (1954) and his colleagues. This model proposed the idea that learning was possible through the completion of various stages. The stages involved include:

- Cognitive phase
- Associative phase
- Autonomous phase (also called the procedural phase)

=== Cognitive phase ===
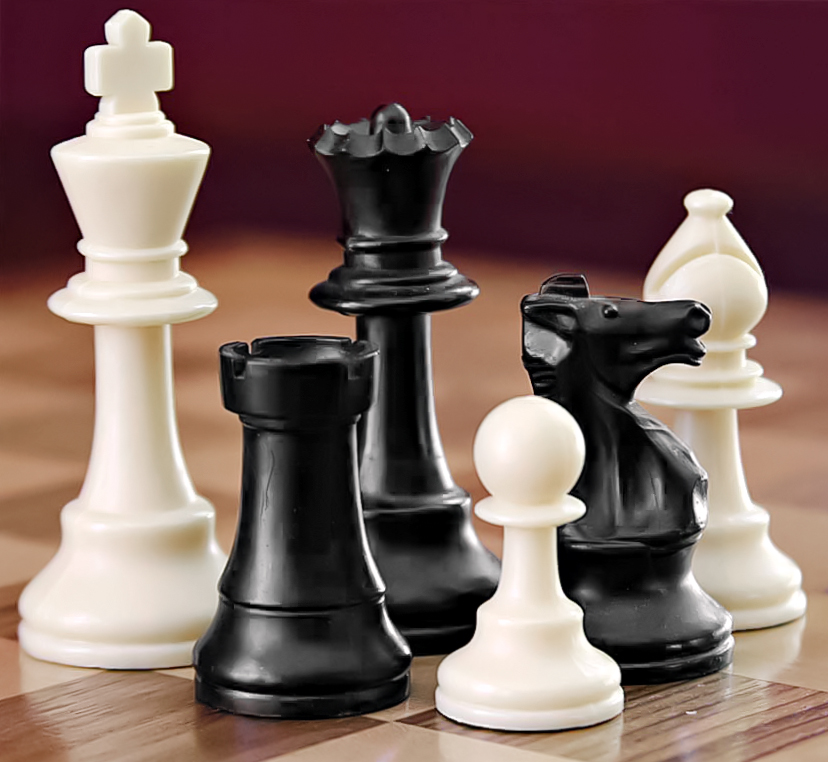
A countless number of potential procedures

At this point in Fitts' (1954) model of skill acquisition individuals come to understand what an observed skill is composed of. Attention at this point in the process is significant for the acquisition of skill. This process involves breaking down the desired skill to be learned into parts and understanding how these parts come together as a whole for the correct performance of the task. The way an individual organizes these parts is known as schemas. Schemas are important in directing the acquisition process and the way an individual comes to choose schemas is described by metacognition.

=== Associative phase ===
The associative phase of the Fitts (1954) model involves individuals repeated practice until patterns of responding emerge. At this part in the model, actions of the skill become learned (or automated) as ineffective actions are dropped. An individual's sensory system acquires the accurate spatial and symbolic data required for the completion of the skill. The ability to differentiate important from unimportant stimuli is crucial at this stage of the model. It is held that the greater the amount of important stimuli associated with a task, the longer it will take to complete this phase of the model.

=== Autonomous phase ===
This is the final phase in Fitts' (1954) model, and it involves perfecting skill acquisition. The ability to discriminate important from unimportant stimuli are made quicker and less thought process is required because the skill has become automated. Important to this phase of the model is experience and factual knowledge store for the observed skill.

=== Alternative view: the "predictive cycle" ===
Another model for understanding skill acquisition through procedural memory has been proposed by Tadlock (2005). The model is significantly different from Fitts' 1954 view in that it does not require conscious understanding of a skill's components. Rather, the learner is only required to maintain in conscious awareness a concept of the desired result. Tadlock has applied the view successfully to reading remediation (Scott et al., 2010). The stages involved include:

- Attempt
- Fail
- Implicitly analyze the result
- Implicitly decide how to change the next attempt so that success is achieved

The stages are repeated over and over until the learner builds or remodels the neural network to guide an activity appropriately and accurately without conscious thought. The context for this view is similar to how physical therapy works to help brain-injured patients recover lost functions. The patient maintains the desired result (e.g., control over hand movement) while making repeated attempts, without conscious awareness of the neural activity required to make the hand move. The patient continues to make attempts until movement is achieved. In the case of brain injury, how much progress is made depends upon the extent of the injury and the "mental force" or "will power" applied by the individual. Most individuals with reading problems have brains unaffected by brain injury, but negatively affected by an undefined problem with early learning in the area of reading. Because the brain is otherwise healthy, Tadlock has used highly structured methods associated with the Predictive Cycle to successfully remediate individuals with mild to severe reading problems (including dyslexia).

=== Practice and the power law of learning ===
Practice can be an effective way to learn new skills if knowledge of the result, more commonly known as feedback, is involved. There is an observed phenomenon known as the power law of learning, which predicts the rate of skill acquisition over practice time. The power law of learning says that learning occurs at the fastest rate in the beginning then drastically tapers off. The rate at which practice loses its ability to sharpen execution is independent from the skill being practiced and the type of animal learning the skill. For example, participants in a reading speed study made the greatest leap in the first days of the experiment, while additional days of practice saw only slight improvement.

The power law of learning can be overcome if the subject is shown a more effective way to accomplish the task. A study subject was shown a film comparing his task performance, kicking a target as rapidly as possible, with that of a known way of minimizing kicking time. Though the subject had reached the limit of his ability to improve through practice as predicted by the power law of learning, viewing the film resulted in a breakthrough in his ability that defied the power law of learning. Viewing the film is an example of observational learning, which effectively gives the viewer new memories of a technique to draw upon for his or her future performances of the task.

== Tests ==
=== Pursuit rotor task ===
A device used to study visual-motor tracking skills and hand–eye coordination by requiring the participant to follow a moving object with a cursor or use a stylus to follow the target on a computer screen or a turntable. With the computer screen version, the participant follows a dot on a circular path like the one shown below.

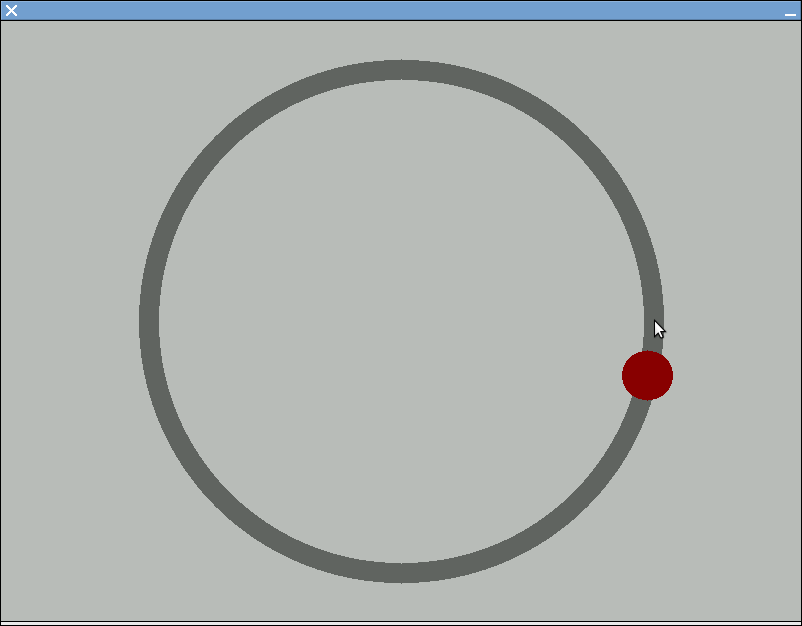
Screenshot of a computerized version of the pursuit rotor task.

The pursuit rotor task is a simple pure visual-motor tracking test that has consistent results within age groups. This displays a measurement of procedural memory as well as demonstrates the participant's fine motor skills. The pursuit rotor task tests the fine-motor skills which are controlled by the motor cortex illustrated by the green section below.

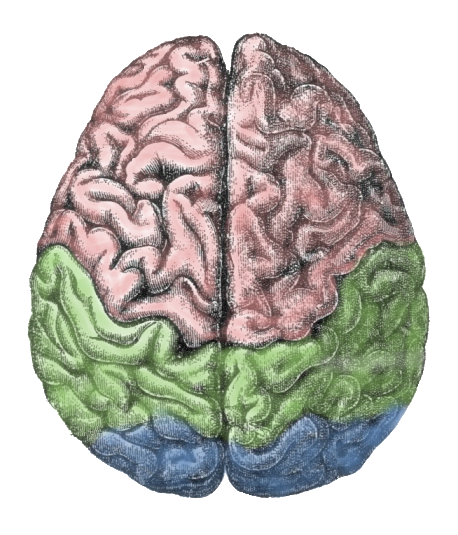

The results are then calculated by the participant's time-on and time-off the object. Amnesic participants show no impairment in this motor task when tested at later trials. It does however seem to be affected by lack of sleep and drug use.

=== Serial reaction time task ===
This task involves having participants retain and learn procedural skills that assess specific memory for procedural-motor skill. These skills are measured by observing the speed and accuracy of the participant's ability to retain and acquire new skills. The reaction time is the time it takes for the participant to respond to the designated cue presented to them. Participants with Alzheimer's disease and amnesia demonstrate a long retention time which indicates that they are able to retain the skill and demonstrate effective performance of the task at a later point in time.

=== Mirror tracing task ===
This task looks at the integration of the senses more specifically as it is a visual motor test where the participants learn a new motor skill involving hand–eye coordination. Evidence is shown for procedural memory as amnesic participants are able to learn and retain this task. Drawing the image is the work of your procedural memory; once you figure out how to draw the image in the mirror you have little difficulty the second time. Individuals with Alzheimer's disease are not able to recall the skills acquired in a mirror tracing task, but they acquire the procedural performance ability regardless.

=== Weather prediction task ===
Specifically, this task uses experimental analysis of weather prediction. As a probability learning task, the participant is required to indicate what strategy they are using to solve the task. It is a cognitively-oriented task that is learned in a procedural manner. It is designed using multidimensional stimuli, so participants are given a set of cards with shapes and then asked to predict the outcome. After the prediction is made participants receive feedback and make a classification based on that feedback. For example, the participant can be shown one pattern and then asked to predict whether the pattern indicates good or bad weather. The actual weather outcome will be determined by a probabilistic rule based on each individual card. Amnesic participants learn this task in training but are impaired in later training control.

=== Choice reaction task ===
Choice reaction tasks have been used to assess working memory. It has been determined to be useful in gauging procedural working memory by asking participants to follow stimulus-reaction rules.

== Expertise ==
=== Divided attention ===
There are several factors that contribute to the exceptional performance of a skill: memory capacities, knowledge structures, problem-solving abilities, and attentional abilities. They all play key roles, each with its own degree of importance based on the procedures and skills required, the context, and the intended goals of the performance. Using these individualized abilities to compare how experts and novices differ regarding both cognitive and sensorimotor skills has provided a wealth of insight into what makes an expert excellent, and conversely, what sorts of mechanisms novices lack. Evidence suggests that an often overlooked condition for skill excellence is attentional mechanisms involved in the effective utilization and deployment of procedural memory during the real-time execution of skills. Research suggests that early in skill learning, execution is controlled by a set of unintegrated procedural steps that are held in working memory and attended to one-by-one in a step-by-step fashion. The problem with this is that attention is a limited resource. Therefore, this step-by-step process of controlling task performance occupies attentional capacity which in turn reduces the performer's ability to focus on other aspects of the performance, such as decision making, fine motor-skills, self-monitoring of energy level and "seeing the field or ice or court". However, with practice, procedural knowledge develops, which operates largely outside of working memory, and thus allows for skills to be executed more automatically. This, of course, has a very positive effect on overall performance by freeing the mind of the need to closely monitor and attend to the more basic, mechanical skills, so that attention can be paid to other processes.

=== Choking under pressure ===
It is well established that highly practiced, over-learned skills are performed automatically; they are controlled in real time, supported by procedural memory, require little attention, and operate largely outside of working memory. However, sometimes even experienced and highly skilled performers falter under conditions of stress. This phenomenon is commonly referred to as choking, and serves as a very interesting exception to the general rule that well-learned skills are robust and resistant to deterioration across a wide range of conditions. Although not well understood, it is widely accepted that the underlying cause of choking is performance pressure, which has been defined as an anxious desire to perform very well in a given situation. Choking is most often associated with motor skills, and the most common real-life instances are in sports. It is common for professional athletes who are highly trained to choke in the moment and perform poorly. However, choking can occur within any domain that demands a high level of performance involving complex cognitive, verbal or motor skills. "Self-focus" theories suggest that pressure increases anxiety and self-consciousness about performing correctly, which in turn causes an increase in attention paid to the processes directly involved in the execution of the skill. This attention to the step-by-step procedure disrupts the well-learned, automatic (proceduralized) performance. What was once an effortless and unconscious retrieval execution of a procedural memory becomes slow and deliberate. Evidence suggests that the more automated a skill is the more resistant it is to distractions, performance pressure, and subsequent choking. This serves as a good example of the relative durability of procedural memory over episodic memory. In addition to deliberate practice and automatization of skills, self-consciousness training has been shown to help with reducing the effect of choking under pressure.

==== Rising to the occasion ====
If choking on skill-based or co-ordination oriented tasks requires the pressure of the situation to cause the performer's increased conscious attention to his or her process of performance, then the reverse can also be true. A relatively unexplored area of scientific research is the concept of "rising to the occasion." One common misconception is that a person must be an expert in order to have consistent success under pressure. On the contrary, implicit knowledge has been hypothesized to only partially mediate the relationship between expertise and performance. It works closely with a perceived control of the task, and can often trump expertise if the performer embodies procedural comfort within the domain. Traditionally, "rising to the occasion" or being "clutch" has been used in reference to sporting feats of particular excellence given the magnitude of the event, however there is increasing awareness to the phenomenon in our everyday life. How one performs under circumstances that do not necessarily present immediate or grave consequence, but do require the performer to actively access a conscious mechanism to perform in unfamiliar or uncomfortable settings, is a concept that may prove educationally beneficial across a variety of disciplines and activities.

==== Famous examples of choking ====
- 1996 Masters golf tournament, Greg Norman lost to Nick Faldo
- 1993 Wimbledon women's final, Jana Novotná lost to Steffi Graf
- 2011 Masters golf tournament, Rory McIlroy started the final day first, but dropped 8 shots in 3 holes at the turn.
- 2019 President's Trophy winning Tampa Bay Lightning swept by 8th seed Columbus Blue Jackets in round 1 of the NHL playoffs.

=== Expertise-induced amnesia ===
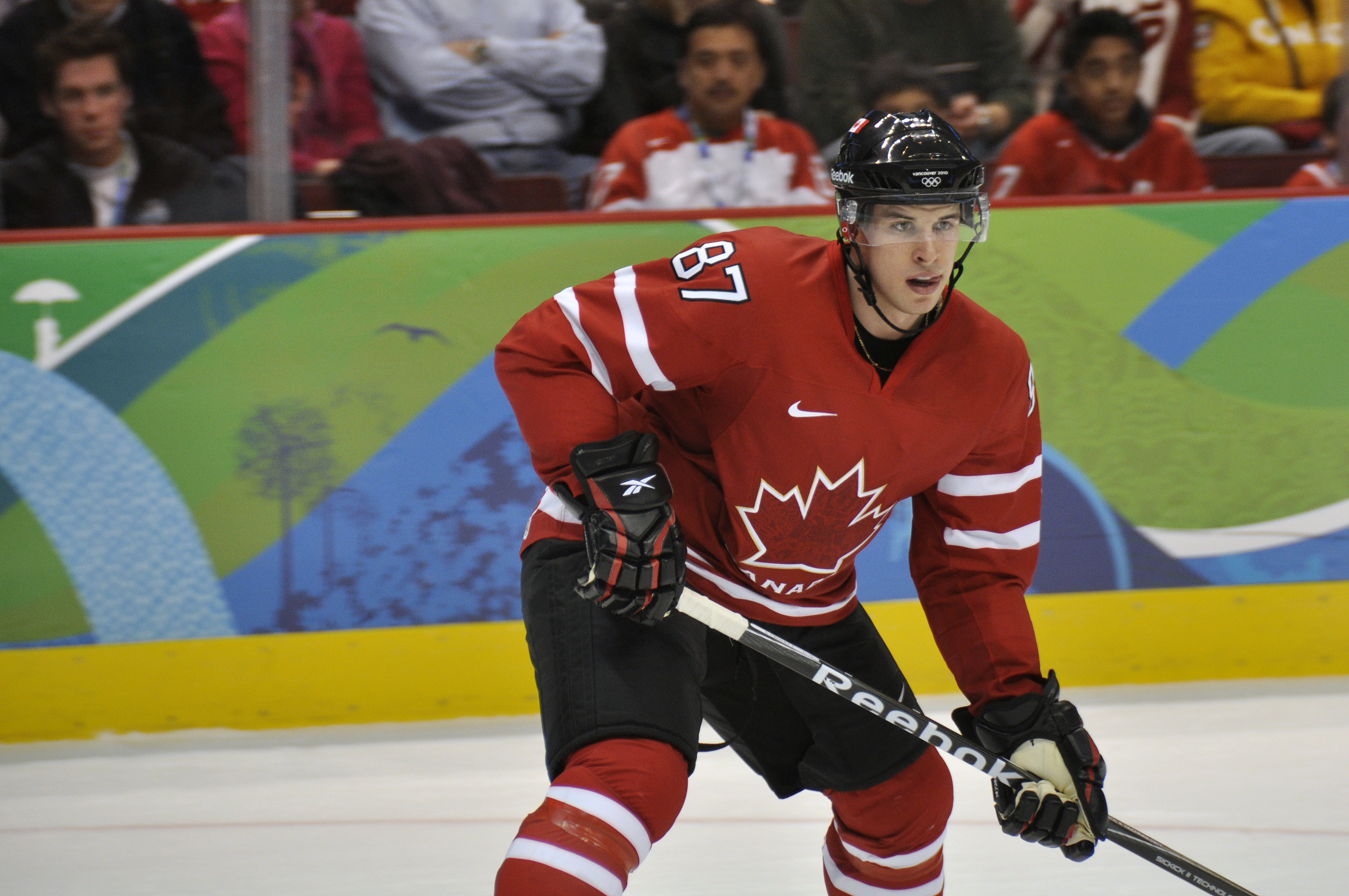
Sidney Crosby in Vancouver, playing for Team Canada

This phenomenon is based on the assumption that reducing or diverting the amount of attention paid to material being encoded and stored will reduce the quality and quantity of the later retrieval of that material in a form that is explicit and reportable. So, if a well learned skill is stored as a procedural memory, and its retrieval and subsequent performance is mostly unconscious and automatic, there is evidence showing that the explicit recollection of what happened during the performance will be reduced. A recent example illustrates this concept nicely. Immediately following Sidney Crosby's overtime goal against the US, winning the 2010 Olympic Gold Medal for Canada in men's ice hockey, a reporter with TSN did an on-ice interview with Crosby: "Sid, if you can, just take us through how that goal went in?" Crosby replied: "I don't really remember, I just shot it – I think from around here. That's all I really remember. I think it went 5-hole, but, um, I didn't really see it to be honest."

== Genetic influence ==
Genetic makeup has been found to impact skill learning and performance, and therefore plays a role in achieving expertise. Using the pursuit rotor task, one study examined the effects of practice in identical and fraternal twins raised in separate homes. Because identical twins share 100% of their genes while fraternal twins share 50%, the impact of genetic makeup on skill learning could be examined. The results of the pursuit rotor task test became more identical with practice over time for the identical twins, whereas the results for the fraternal twins became more disparate with practice. In other words, the performance of the skill by the identical twins became closer to 100% identical, while the fraternal twins' skill performance became less identical, suggesting the 50% difference in genetic makeup is responsible for the difference in skill performance. The study shows that more practice leads to a closer representation of a person's innate capability, also known as talent. Therefore, some of the differences people show after extended practice increasingly reflects their genetics. The study also confirmed the idea that practice improves skill learning by showing that, in both the identical and fraternal groups, more practice aided in shedding ineffective tendencies in order to improve execution of a given skill. Currently, the link between learning and genetics has been limited to simple task learning, while a link to more complex forms of learning, such as the learning of cognitive skills, has not been confirmed.

== Anatomical structures ==
=== Striatum and basal ganglia ===
Basal ganglia (red) and related structures (blue) shown within the brain

The dorsolateral striatum is associated with the acquisition of habits and is the main neuronal cell nucleus linked to procedural memory. Connecting excitatory afferent nerve fibers help in the regulation of activity in the basal ganglia circuit. Essentially, two parallel information processing pathways diverge from the striatum. Both acting in opposition to each other in the control of movement, they allow for association with other needed functional structures One pathway is direct while the other is indirect and all pathways work together to allow for a functional neural feedback loop. Many looping circuits connect back at the striatum from other areas of the brain; including those from the emotion-center linked limbic cortex, the reward-center linked ventral striatum and other important motor regions related to movement. The main looping circuit involved in the motor skill part of procedural memory is usually called the cortex-basal ganglia-thalamus-cortex loop.

The striatum is unique because it lacks the glutamate-related neurons found throughout most of the brain. Instead, it is categorized by a high concentration of a special type of GABA related inhibiting cell known as the medium spiny neuron. The two parallel pathways previously mentioned travel to and from the striatum and are made up of these same special medium spiny neurons. These neurons are all sensitive to different neurotransmitters and contain a variety of corresponding receptors including dopamine receptors (DRD1, DRD2), muscarinic receptors (M4) and adenosine receptors (A2A). Separate interneurons are known to communicate with striatal spiny neurons in the presence of the somatic nervous system neurotransmitter acetylcholine.

Current understanding of brain anatomy and physiology suggests that striatal neural plasticity is what allows basal ganglia circuits to communicate between structures and to functionally operate in procedural memory processing.

=== Cerebellum ===
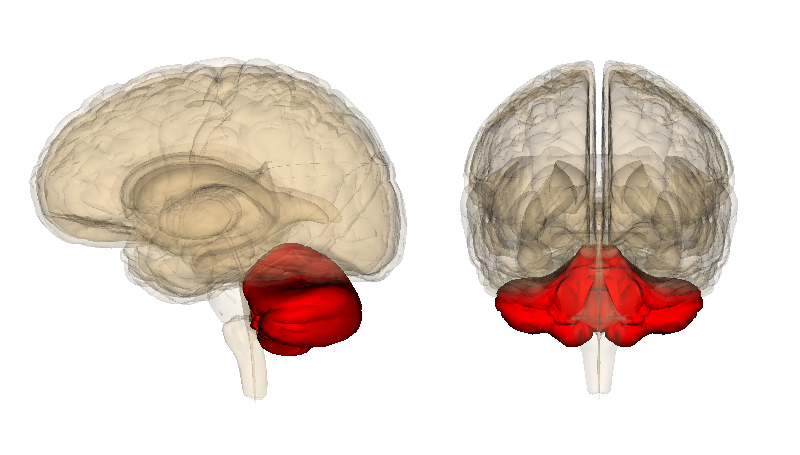
The cerebellum is highlighted red

The cerebellum is known to play a part in correcting movement and in fine-tuning the motor agility found in procedural skills such as painting, instrument playing and in sports such as golf. Damage to this area may prevent the proper relearning of motor skills and through associated research it has more recently been linked to having a role in automating the unconscious process used when learning a procedural skill. New thoughts in the scientific community suggest that the cerebellar cortex holds the holy grail of memory, what is known to researchers as "the engram" or the biological place where memory lives. The initial memory trace is thought to form here between parallel fibers and Purkinje cell and then travel outwards to other cerebellar nuclei for consolidation.

=== Limbic system ===
The limbic system is a group of unique brain areas that work together in many interrelated processes involved in emotion, motivation, learning and memory. Current thinking indicates that the limbic system shares anatomy with a component of the neostriatum already credited with the major task of controlling procedural memory. Once thought to be functionally separate, this vital section of the brain found on the striatum's back border has only recently been linked to memory and is now being called the marginal division zone (MrD). A special membrane protein associated with the limbic system is said to concentrate in related structures and to travel towards the basal nuclei. To put things simply, the activation of brain regions that work together during procedural memory can be followed because of this limbic system associated membrane protein and its application in molecular and immunohistochemistry research.

== Physiology ==
=== Dopamine ===
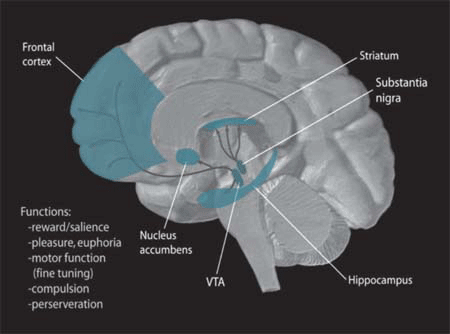
Dopamine Pathways in the brain highlighted in Blue

Dopamine is one of the more known neuromodulators involved in procedural memory. Evidence suggests that it may influence neural plasticity in memory systems by adapting brain processing when the environment is changing and an individual is then forced to make a behavioural choice or series of rapid decisions. It is very important in the process of "adaptive navigation", which serves to help different brain areas respond together during a new situation that has many unknown stimuli and features. Dopamine pathways are dispersed all over the brain and this allows for parallel processing in many structures all at the same time. Currently most research points to the mesocorticolimbic dopamine pathway as the system most related to reward learning and psychological conditioning.

=== At the synapse ===
Recent findings could help explain the relationship between procedural memory, learning and synaptic plasticity at the level of the molecule. One study used small animals lacking normal levels of CREB family transcription factors to look at the processing of information in the striatum during various tasks. Although poorly understood, results show that CREB function is needed at the synapse for linking the acquisition and storage of procedural memory.

== Disorders ==
Disorders have been important for the understanding of memory systems. The memory abilities and inhibitions of patients with various diseases played a major role in establishing the distinction that long-term memory consists of different types of memory, more specifically declarative memory and procedural memory. Furthermore, they have been important for illuminating the structures of the brain that comprise the neural network of procedural memory.

=== Alzheimer's disease and dementia ===
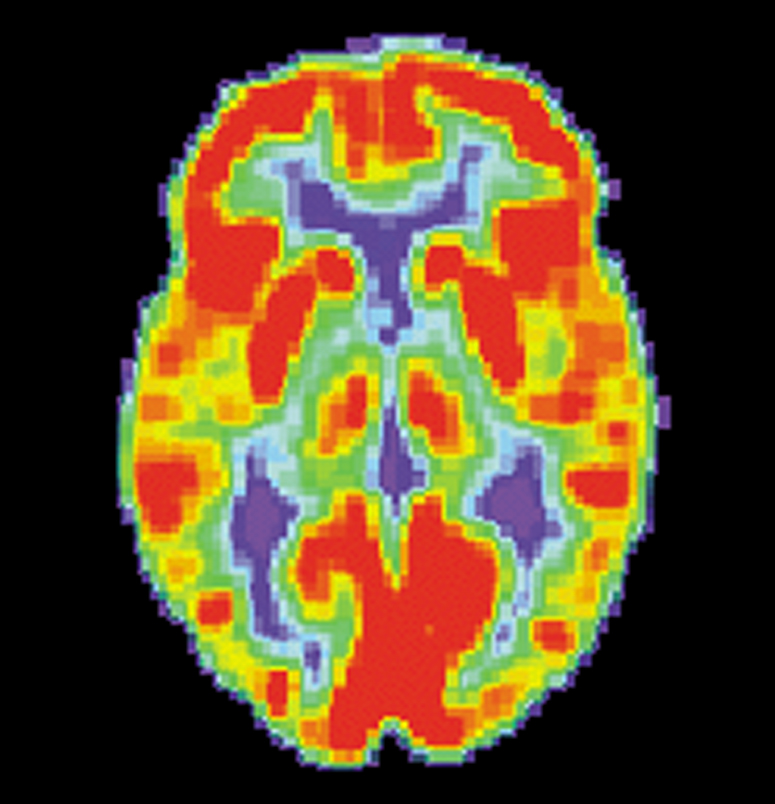
Normal brain

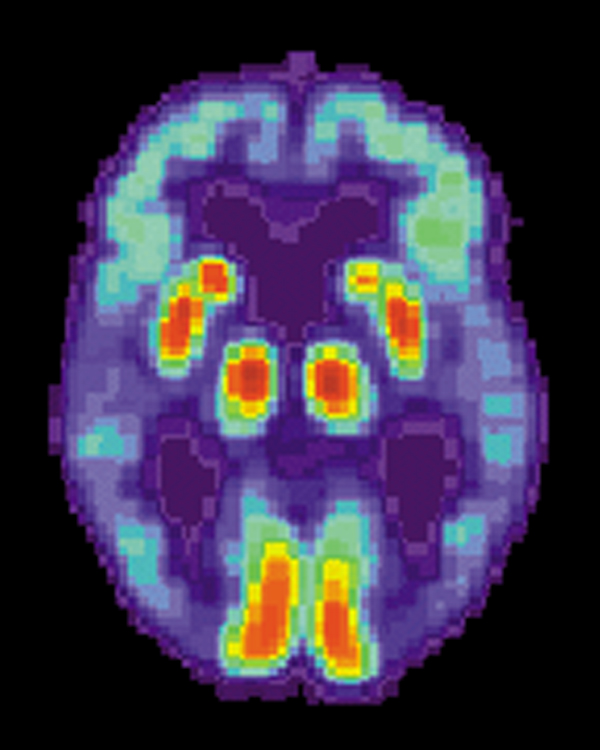
Alzheimer patient

PET scan of normal (left) and Alzheimer's patient brain (right)

Current Research indicates that procedural memory problems in Alzheimer's may be caused by changes in enzyme activity in memory-integrating brain regions such as the hippocampus. The specific enzyme linked to these changes is called acetylcholinesterase (AchE) which may be affected by a genetic predisposition in an immune-system brain receptor called the histamine H1 receptor. The same current scientific information also looks at how dopamine, serotonin and acetylcholine neurotransmitter levels vary in the cerebellum of patients that have this disease. Modern findings advance the idea that the histamine system may be responsible for the cognitive deficits found in Alzheimer's and for the potential procedural memory problems that may develop as a result of the psychopathology.

=== Tourette syndrome ===
This disease of the central nervous system, like many other procedural-memory related disorders, involves changes in the associated subcortical brain area known as the striatum. This area and the brain circuits closely interacting with it from the basal ganglia are affected both structurally and at a more functional level in the people affected by Tourette's syndrome. Current literature on this topic provides evidence for there being many unique forms of procedural memory. The one most relevant to procedural memory and most common in Tourette's is related to the skill-acquisition process that ties stimuli to response during the learning part of procedural memory.

One study has found that those with Tourette syndrome have enhanced procedural learning. Subjects with Tourette's syndrome were found to have more quickly processed procedural knowledge and more accurately learned procedural skills than their typically developed counterparts. Another study found that subjects with Tourette's syndrome displayed faster processing of rule-based grammar than typically developed subjects. Two possible explanations exist for these results. One explanation is that once a person with Tourette's syndrome has learned a procedure, there is a mechanism that supports more accelerated processing. Second, because procedural memory subserves sequencing, and grammar recruits sequencing, an enhancement of grammatical processing was seen in those with Tourette's syndrome due to their improved procedural memories.

=== Human immunodeficiency virus (HIV) ===
Neural systems used by procedural memory are commonly targeted by Human Immunodeficiency Virus; the striatum being the structure most notably affected. MRI studies have even shown white matter irregularity and basal ganglia subcortical atrophy in these vital areas necessary for both procedural memory and motor-skill. Applied research using various procedural memory tasks such as the Rotary pursuit, Mirror star tracing and Weather prediction tasks have shown that HIV positive individuals perform worse than HIV negative participants suggesting that poorer overall performance on tasks is due to the specific changes in the brain caused by the disease.

=== Huntington's disease ===
Coronal FSPGR through the brain of Huntington's patient

Despite Huntington's disease being a disorder that directly affects striatal areas of the brain used in procedural memory, most individuals with the condition display different memory problems from people with striatum related brain diseases. In more advanced stages of the disease, however, procedural memory is affected by damage to the important brain pathways that help the inner subcortical and prefrontal cortex parts of the brain to communicate.

=== Obsessive compulsive disorder ===
Neuroimaging studies show that OCD patients perform considerably better on procedural memory tasks because of noticeable over-activation of the striatum brain structures, specifically the frontostriatal circuit. These studies suggest that procedural memory in OCD patients is unusually improved in the early learning stages of procedural memory. However, another study found that individuals with OCD do not perform significantly different on procedural working memory tasks than healthy controls. Differences between the two studies may be due to the different procedural memory tests that were used and the different aspects of procedural working memory they may be tapping on. Specifically, the study which found improved performance in early stages of procedural memory employed a pursuit rotor task, whilst the study that found no differences in procedural memory between controls and OCD participants used a choice reaction task.

=== Parkinson's disease ===
Parkinson's disease is known to affect selective areas in the frontal lobe area of the brain. Current scientific information suggests that the memory performance problems notably shown in patients are controlled by unusual frontostriatal circuits. Parkinson's patients often have difficulty with the sequence-specific knowledge that is needed in the acquisition step of procedural memory. Further evidence suggests that the frontal lobe networks relate to executive function and only act when specific tasks are presented to the patient. This tells us that the frontostriatal circuits are independent but able to work collaboratively with other areas of the brain to help with various things such as paying attention or focusing.

=== Schizophrenia ===
MRI studies have shown that schizophrenic patients not currently taking related medication have a smaller putamen, part of the striatum that plays a very important role in procedural memory. Further studies on the brain reveal that schizophrenics have improper basal ganglia communication with the surrounding extrapyramidal system that is known to be closely involved with the motor system and in the coordination of movement. The most recent belief is that functional problems in the striatum of schizophrenic patients are not significant enough to seriously impair procedural learning, however, research shows that the impairment will be significant enough to cause problems improving performance on a task between practice intervals.

== Drugs ==
Overall, research concerning the effects of drugs on procedural memory is still limited. This limitation stems from the fact that procedural memory is implicit and thus more difficult to test, as opposed to declarative memory which is more pronounced and thus easier memory system to use for determining the effects of an observed drug.

=== Alcohol ===
While the effects of alcohol have been studied immensely, even with respect to memory, there is limited research examining the effects of alcohol on procedural memory. Research conducted by Pitel A. L. et al. suggests that alcoholism impairs the ability to acquire semantic concepts. In this study, while semantic concepts were understood, procedural memory was often not automated. A potential reason for this finding is that poor learning strategies are used by alcoholics compared to non-alcoholics.

=== Cocaine ===
It is evident that long-term cocaine abuse alters brain structures. Research has shown that the brain structures that are immediately affected by long-term cocaine abuse include: cerebral hypoperfusion in the frontal, periventricular and temporal-parietal. These structures play a role in various memory systems. Furthermore, the drug cocaine elicits its desirable effects by blocking the DRD1 dopamine receptors in the striatum, resulting in increased dopamine levels in the brain. These receptors are important for the consolidation of procedural memory. These increased dopamine levels in the brain resultant of cocaine use is similar to the increased dopamine levels in the brain found in schizophrenics. Studies have compared the common memory deficits caused by both cases to further understand the neural networks of procedural memory. To learn more about the effects of dopamine and its role in schizophrenia see: dopamine hypothesis of schizophrenia. Studies using rats have shown that when rats are administered trace amounts of cocaine, their procedural memory systems are negatively impacted. Specifically, the rats are unable to effectively consolidate motor-skill learning. With cocaine abuse being associated with poor procedural learning, research has shown that abstinence from cocaine is associated with sustained improvement of motor-skill learning (Wilfred et al.).

=== Psychostimulants ===
Most psychostimulants work by activating dopamine receptors causing increased focus or pleasure. The usage of psychostimulants has become more widespread in the medical world for treating conditions like ADHD. Psychostimulants have been shown to be used more frequently today amongst students and other social demographics as a means to study more efficiently or have been abused for their pleasurable side effects. Research suggests that when not abused, psychostimulants aid in the acquisition of procedural learning. Studies have shown that psychostimulants like d-amphetamine facilitates lower response times and increased procedural learning when compared to control participants and participants who have been administered the antipsychotic haloperidol on procedural learning tasks. While improvements in procedural memory were evident when participants were administered traces of psychostimulants, many researchers have found that procedural memory is hampered when psychostimulants are abused. This introduces the idea that for optimal procedural learning, dopamine levels must be balanced.

== Sleep ==
Practice is clearly an important process for learning and perfecting a new skill. With over 40 years of research, it is well established in both humans and animals that the formation of all forms of memory are greatly enhanced during the brain-state of sleep. Furthermore, with humans, sleep has been consistently shown to aid in the development of procedural knowledge by the ongoing process of memory consolidation, especially when sleep soon follows the initial phase of memory acquisition. Memory consolidation is a process that transforms novel memories from a relatively fragile state to a more robust and stable condition. For a long time it was believed that the consolidation of procedural memories took place solely as a function of time, but more recent studies suggest, that for certain forms of learning, the consolidation process is exclusively enhanced during periods of sleep. However, not just any type of sleep is sufficient to improve procedural memory and performance on subsequent procedural tasks. Within the domain of motor skill, there is evidence showing that no improvement on tasks is shown following a short, non-rapid eye movement (NREM; stages 2–4) sleep, such as a nap. REM sleep following a period of slow-wave sleep (SWS; combined stage 3 and 4 and the deepest form of NREM sleep), has shown to be the most beneficial type of sleep for procedural memory enhancement, especially when it takes place immediately after the initial acquisition of a skill. So essentially, a full night (or day) of uninterrupted sleep soon after learning a skill will allow for the most memory consolidation possible. Furthermore, if REM sleep is disrupted, there is no gain in procedural performance shown. However, equal improvement will take place whether the sleep after practice was at night or during the daytime, as long as SWS is followed by REM sleep. It has also been shown that the enhancement in memory is specific to the learned stimulus (i.e., learning a running technique will not cross over to improvements in biking performance). Subject performance in the Wff 'n Proof Task, the Tower of Hanoi, and the Mirror Tracing Task has been found to improve following REM sleep periods.

Whether a skill is learned explicitly (with attention) or implicitly, each plays a role in the offline consolidation effect. Research suggests that explicit awareness and understanding of the skill being learned during the acquisition process greatly improves the consolidation of procedural memories during sleep. This finding is not surprising, as it is widely accepted that intention and awareness at time of learning enhances the acquisition of most forms of memory.

== Language ==
Language works because of the brain's ability to retrieve pieces of information from memory and then combine those pieces into a larger, more complex unit based on context. The latter part of this process is called unification. Results of several studies provide evidence that suggests procedural memory is not only responsible for sequential unification, but for syntactic priming and grammatical processing as well.

One study used patients with Korsakoff's syndrome to show that procedural memory subserves syntactic priming. Although Korsakoff's patients have deficits in declarative memory, their nondeclarative memory is preserved, allowing them to successfully complete syntactic priming tasks, as in the study. This result proves syntactic priming is a nondeclarative memory function. These patients were also capable of forming proper grammatical sentences, suggesting that procedural memory is responsible for grammatical processing in addition to syntactic priming.

Another study's results support the hypothesis that procedural memory subserves grammar. The study involved a series of tests for two groups: one typically developing (TD) group and one group with developmental language disorder (DLD). Those with DLD have difficulty with proper grammar usage, due to deficits in procedural memory function. Overall, the TD group performed better on each task and displayed better speed in grammatical processing than the DLD group. Therefore, this study shows that grammatical processing is a function of procedural memory.

According to a study carried out in 2010 by Dalhousie University researchers, spoken languages which require the use of helping words or suffixes, rather than word order, to explain subject-object relationships rely on procedural memory. Word-order dependent languages rely on short-term memory for equivalent tasks.

== See also ==
- Automaticity – Ability to do things without occupying the mind with the low-level details required
- Dreyfus model of skill acquisition – Model of learning
- Explicit memory – Type of long-term human memory
- Kata – Detailed choreographed patterns of movements in martial arts
- Motor learning – Movements that reflect nervous system changes
- Muscle memory – Consolidating a motor task into memory through repetition
- Neuroplasticity – Ability of the brain to continuously change
- Procedural knowledge – Knowledge of how to perform a task
- Sleep and memory
- Working memory – Cognitive system for temporarily holding information
