= Memory and social interactions =

Memory supports and enables social interactions in a variety of ways. In order to engage in successful social interaction, people must be able to remember how they should interact with one another, whom they have interacted with previously, and what occurred during those interactions. There are a lot of brain processes and functions that go into the application and use of memory in social interactions, as well as psychological reasoning for its importance.

== Memory for faces ==
The ability to visually identify previous social partners is essential for successful interactions because it aids in recognizing which partners can and cannot be trusted. In humans, this is accomplished by facial recognition. Research suggests that humans are born with an innate ability to process other human faces. In one study, Pascalis, et al. (1995) found that four-day-old neonates (infants) prefer to look at their mothers' faces rather than at a stranger's face. This finding suggests that neonates are able to remember, recognize, and differentiate between faces. Further research suggests that humans prefer to focus on faces rather than non-face alternatives. Such specialized processing for faces aids in the encoding of memory for people. This preference is one explanation for why humans are more proficient at memorizing faces than non-faces.

=== Brain structures ===
There are several areas of the brain associated with the highly specialized form of memory for faces.

==== Fusiform face area ====
The fusiform face area (FFA) is associated with facial recognition. It is generally located on the fusiform gyrus in the temporal lobe, but its precise location varies between individuals. The FFA has been found to show a degree of lateralization, or what side of the brain the activity is likely to be found. Typically, it is larger in the right hemisphere of the brain. It is widely accepted that the FFA is involved in the encoding and retrieval of memory for faces and other familiar categorical processing.

Damage to the FFA has been shown to lead to severe deficits in facial recognition and processing. These deficits can lead to difficulty in maintaining normal social relationships over an extended period.

==== Amygdala ====
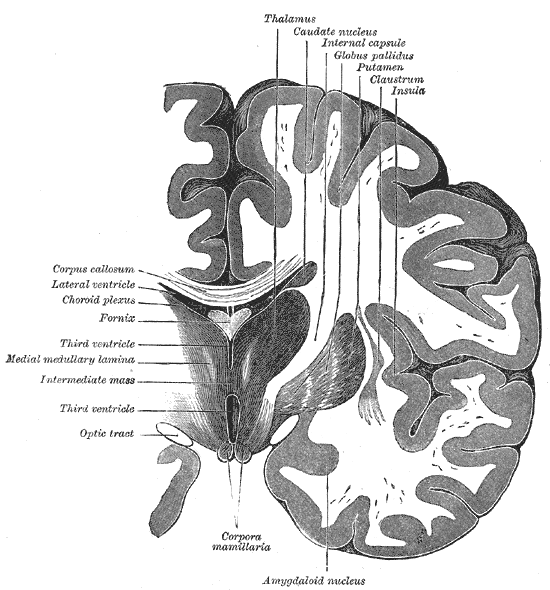
Amygdaloid nucleus, or amygdala, can be seen in the medial temporal lobe.

The amygdala is one of the major structures in the limbic system. It is also known to play a role in the processing of memory for emotional events.

One study, performed by Adolphs, et al. (1998), found striking differences in perceived trustworthiness and approachability ratings between subjects with complete bilateral amygdala damage and a control group. The results showed that all of the amygdally impaired subjects rated unfamiliar faces as much more trustworthy and approachable than familiar faces. Furthermore, the impaired subjects rated faces as trustworthy which the control group considered dubious. These findings illustrate a large difference in the amygdally impaired subjects' perception of faces. The same study went on to determine whether or not the difference generalizes to an auditory description of a person. The impaired subjects made entirely normal perceptions in this task. Overall, the research suggests that the amygdala is important for the making and retrieval of social judgements.

==== Hippocampus ====
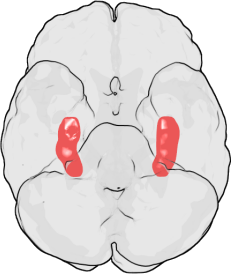
Ventral view of the brain. Hippocampus shown in red.

The hippocampus is a structure located in the medial temporal lobe. It is thought to be involved in the encoding, consolidation and retrieval of memories. This structure's function is probably best known from specific case studies, the most famous being Henry Molaison, formerly known as patient H.M., whose medial temporal lobes were bilaterally removed, which means that both sides were removed, in an attempt to cure his epileptic seizures. As a result, he experienced severe anterograde amnesia.

=== Difficulties with facial recognition ===
Several disorders or impairments have been found to disrupt an individual's ability to successfully process faces.

==== Autism spectrum disorders ====
Autism spectrum disorders (ASD) are neurological development disorders characterized by repetitive behaviors and impaired social skills. Patients with ASD are also characterized by over-selectivity, which is a tendency to attend to only a few stimuli. Over-selectivity causes memory encoding problems, as relevant information is not attended to, and thus not stored in memory. These encoding problems are associated with an impaired memory for faces, which is in turn associated with impairments in social functioning.

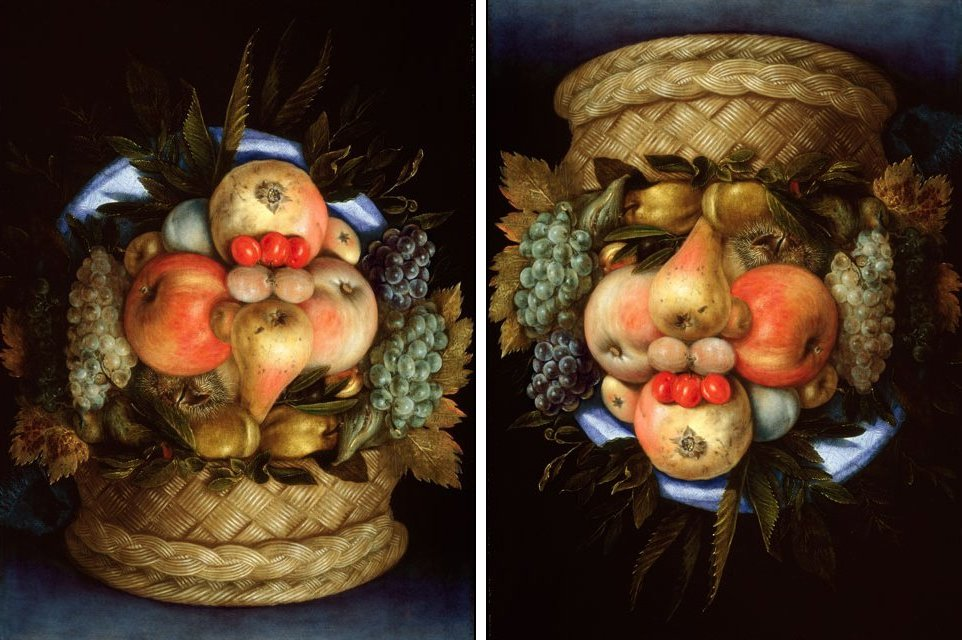
In pictures such as this prosopagnosics can identify each individual fruit but cannot identify the face.

==== Prosopagnosia ====
Prosopagnosia is an inability to identify faces and face-like objects. This represents a failure to encode incoming visual information. Neurological studies indicate that prosopagnosia is associated with bilateral lesions of the central visual system, primarily located in the medial occipitotemporal region. The inability to correctly recognize a face can have detrimental consequences for building social relationships due to the fact that recognition is required for associating feelings or experiences with a stimulus.

== Memory for previous interactions ==
Memory for previous interactions is critical for successful long-term social relationships. This is largely due to a human expectation of reciprocity, which requires humans to have a better memory for favours or debts owed. These memories play an important role in deciding whether or not a human interacts with another in the future, as they contribute to the construction of a person's reputation. Milinski, Semmann & Krambeck (2002) have demonstrated, through the use of public goods games and indirect reciprocity games, that humans are less likely to interact with those who have a reputation for not equivalently returning the favour.

Research indicates that long-term memory can directly influence a person's choice of strategy during interaction. Participants with normal memory functioning were found to use a wider variety of techniques in the prisoner's dilemma task. Thus, memory constraints alter the strategies used during social interactions.

=== Impression formation ===
The impressions humans leave each other with after interactions, whether active or passive, help to build reputations.

A study by Espejo (2003) has demonstrated that the extent of a social interaction does not significantly affect short-term memory retention for that interaction. This indicates that the processes by which impressions are formed do not take much time to occur. Furthermore, as these results were demonstrated in rats with lesioning in the medial prefrontal cortex, a key brain structure for social interaction, they suggest a multi-component system of memory. However, a study by Belmore (1987) on impression formation and serial position indicated that behaviours from early in an acquaintance are no better recalled than later events.

Expectations about a person can influence what is remembered about that individual after an initial interaction. Therefore, such information affects the impression one person makes on another. For example, Srull (1981) found that people had better recall for memories of a person acting in a way opposite to previous expectations. This was attributed to the repeated retrieval of such memories in attempts to reconcile them with the person's reputation.

Furthermore, the memories that contribute to an impression appear to be influenced by negativity and the source of behaviour. Research on the subject indicates that people are more likely to remember negative behaviour when it is perceived as coming from a moral or dispositional source, and positive behaviour when seen as coming from either a person's ability or a need to suit the situation. Positive behaviours result from a desire to appear socially acceptable, whereas negative behaviours are more revealing of the individual's personality. Thus, negative behaviours lead to more questioning of the individual's actual personality, which in turn results in more methodical processing of that person's behaviour. This is believed to produce better memory for events by forming more associative links to the memory of that behaviour. However, positive behaviour may also be subject to this improved memory if there is reason to doubt the behaviour. If a critical assessment of an individual's actions results in a contrast to their positive image, the amount of interaction with that person will decrease.

=== Memory for cheaters and cooperators ===
In psychology, friends and foes do not have a consistent definition. One definition of friends and foes is as cheaters and non-cheaters, with non-cheaters also referred to as cooperators. Cheaters are defined as those who benefit from cooperation, but endure no costs, thereby discouraging cooperators. Cheaters benefit from others' cooperation without the costs of reciprocation. Cooperation is risky because those who cooperate gamble with the possibility of being exploited by a cheater.

Enhanced memory for faces of cheaters has been well demonstrated in humans. Specifically, when exposed to trustworthy and untrustworthy faces, the memories of untrustworthy faces persist longer through an extinction procedure than do trustworthy faces, and when presented with pictures of faces with accompanying descriptions of cheating, trustworthy, or irrelevant information, people have enhanced source memory for the faces of cheaters. However, the existence of a cognitive module specific to cheater detection is the subject of scientific debate. While enhanced memory for cheaters is most likely due to a specific cognitive module, there is currently insufficient evidence to support the existence of this specific module due to the difficulty of demonstrating such an evolutionary cognitive trait.

Cheater recognition is closely related to the recognition of specific emotions. Bell et al. argue for the existence of an emotional incongruity effect. Memory is better for the face of a smiling cheater than of a smiling cooperator, because the incongruity captures the attention of the participant. If the emotion violates the expectancy then it is much better remembered. Furthermore, negative information is much better remembered whether it violates expectancies or not. Negative emotions have a strong effect on source memory due to the presence of threatening stimuli. Memory is determined by the emotional reaction of people at the encoding stage for both trustworthy and cheaters' facial expressions. Furthermore, encoding levels process the recognition for traits and features of face recognition over expression of the face. Memory is more readily remembered for emotionally involving information than for emotionally neutral information.

Friends and foes are represented differently in the brain. The fusiform cortex, posterior cingulate gyrus, amygdala, and areas involved in motivational control were differentially activated as a function of previous social encounters. In general, these areas were more active when faces were perceived as foes rather than friends.

=== Destination memory ===
Destination memory is the ability to remember information one has conveyed to others. Destination memory is important for conversations because it allows people to recall what was already talked about. An example of destination memory failure is when one tells a story multiple times, unaware that listeners have heard the story before. Deficiency in destination memory is more common among older adults, but has been reported by university students as well. Destination memory is notoriously poor due to ineffective integration of components of episodic memory. However, there appear to be few, if any, negative social implications for poor destination memory.

== Implicit memory ==
Implicit memory is the non-declarative, or unspoken, aspects of memory. Priming, motor memory and classical conditioning are all examples of implicit memory. An example of implicit memory's effect on our social interactions has been illustrated by the pin-in-hand phenomenon. This phenomenon was first observed by Claparède while dealing with an amnesiac patient. Normally, he would shake the patient's hand and introduce himself, as the patient thought it was their first time meeting. However, on one occasion he hid a pin and pricked the patient with it when she reached to shake his hand. Later, when he offered his hand, she drew away and refused to shake, in spite of the fact she could not explicitly recall the pinprick itself. The patient was unable to provide a reason for her hesitation.

=== Memory for social norms ===
Social norms are unspoken rules that govern acceptable behaviours in a given social situation. Violation of these norms can be considered extremely offensive, and may lead to social rejection. Thus, it is adaptive to be able to adhere to social norms, which requires memory of them. As a person matures, they tend to passively gain an intricate understanding of the norms associated with their culture.

=== Schemata ===
One way memory can affect social interactions is through schemata. A schema is a mental structure implemented in order to sort knowledge into central themes or subjects. Although schemata develop from experience, not all experiences are organized with schemata. Schemata can influence the way in which new people and situations are understood, which has a direct effect on social interaction.

Many research studies have been conducted concerning the effect of schemata on individuals' perceptions of others. It has been found that preschoolers are aware of gender schemata and are capable of pointing out behaviours which are inconsistent with them. In a Canadian study, participants were asked to rate various diverse groups based on how well a given characteristic applied to them. The results confirmed that participants were quicker to assign a rating if the given characteristics fit the schema for that group.

Schemata have been proposed as a way to explain the persistence of stereotypes. According to this theory, negative stereotypes persist because information that is incongruent with a schema is not organized and thus less likely to be remembered. Therefore, schemata influence what information is encoded and retrieved from memory, thereby influencing social interactions.

== Impairments ==
Any condition that causes a memory deficit will affect social functioning. This will differ based on the nature and severity of the deficit. For example, patients with Alzheimer's disease have difficulty during social interactions because of agnosia, and aphasia.

== See also ==
- Explicit memory
- Korsakoff's syndrome
