= Aschoff's Rules =

Aschoff's Rules consist of three generalized statements that were first introduced by Jürgen Aschoff. These rules are fundamental in the field of chronobiology as they describe how the circadian rhythms of both diurnal and nocturnal animals are impacted by varying light conditions.

The circadian rhythm, regulated by a circadian pacemaker, demonstrates endogenous and entrainable oscillation with a period close to 24 hours. The time required for one circadian oscillation to occur under constant conditions is known as the free-running period (τ). In a natural setting, the circadian rhythm is synchronized with the external environment through entrainment to Zeitgeber signals. Based on his observations of the free-running periods (spontaneous frequencies) of several animal species in varying light exposure, Aschoff proposed Aschoff's rules in collaboration with Colin Pittendrigh, demonstrating how duration and intensity of light exposure affect the circadian pacemaker and behaviors of animals.

Aschoff's Third Rule is the most referenced one because it directly relates changes in circadian period as the result of light intensity. Research on several mammalian species supports Aschoff's rules by lesioning anatomical features related to the circadian clock, demonstrating how circadian rhythm is regulated. Although these rules have remained significant, multiple exceptions have been reported across taxa, especially in arthropods and certain mammalian species. These violations suggest that species-specific adaptations and ecological factors can modulate circadian responses to light. Further studies have also found that Aschoff's First Rule expression is regulated by circadian genes, and mutation of relevant genes causes Aschoff's rule violation.

== History ==
Scientists had begun to observe endogenous daily rhythms as early as 1729. However, it wasn't until 200 years later that the genetic basis of circadian timing was discovered by Erwin Bünning. Chronobiologists discovered that all organisms had an intrinsic free running period (FRP) which Bünning proved to be heritable.

Jürgen Aschoff (January 25, 1913 – October 12, 1998) was a German physician, biologist, and behavioral physiologist. Along with Colin Pittendrigh and Erwin Bünning, Aschoff is widely regarded as a pioneering figure in chronobiology. Aschoff furthered Bünning's work by discovering that FRPs could vary by light intensity. He concluded that the FRP of diurnal organisms decreases with increasing light intensity, whereas nocturnal animals exhibit the inverse relationship. His work led to the discovery that endogenous circadian systems could be modulated by the intensity of constant illumination, a phenomenon generalized as Aschoff's rules. Pittendrigh coined the term "Aschoff's Rule" to describe this phenomenon in his article published in 1960 where he summarized what is now referred to as Aschoff's Third Rule. In the article, he wrote:

"XII: τ_{FR} is light intensity dependent. There is evidence of a fairly strong further generalization which I propose to call Aschoff's Rule. This can be summarized by τ_{LL} > τ_{DD} in nocturnal animals; τ_{LL} < τ_{DD} in diurnal animals."

(τ: endogenous free-running circadian period; FR: free-running; LL: constant light condition; DD: constant darkness condition)

The other two Aschoff's rules were not explicitly stated by Pittendrigh in the article, but they were later included into the circadian nomenclature. The introduction of Aschoff's Rules provided an essential guideline for scientists, underscoring light as the most important Zeitgeber that affects circadian rhythms.

== Impact and significance ==
Aschoff's Rules have had a foundational impact on the study of circadian rhythms, establishing a framework for how internal biological clocks operate and are modulated by environmental light. Aschoff's rules have had widespread applications in chronobiology, influencing subsequent models of circadian entrainment, guiding genetic research and experimental designs, and allowing for the development of light-based therapies.

== Definition ==
=== Definition of Aschoff's Rules ===
Aschoff's Rules are a set of principles in chronobiology that describe the effect light has on the circadian rhythms of diurnal and nocturnal animals. These rules are fundamental to the field of chronobiology and to understanding how different species adapt their activity patterns in varying light conditions.

=== Aschoff's First Rule ===
The endogenous free-running (FR) circadian period (tau, τ) under constant darkness condition (DD) is greater than 24 hours for diurnal animals, and shorter than 24 hours for nocturnal animals.

=== Aschoff's Second Rule ===
Under constant light condition (LL), the relationship between activity time (alpha, α) and rest time (rho, ρ) varies depending on whether the animal is diurnal or nocturnal. In diurnal animals, α increases compared to ρ under LL conditions, and as light intensity increases, the α:ρ ratio and total activity level increases. In nocturnal animals, α decreases under LL, and the α:ρ ratio and overall activity level decreases as light intensity increases.

=== Aschoff's Third Rule ===
Under constant light condition (LL), the circadian period (τ) shortens for diurnal animals and lengthens for nocturnal animals. These effects are enhanced with increased intensity of illumination.

=== Summary ===
Among Aschoff's Rules, chronobiologists primarily reference Aschoff's Third Rule, as it deals directly with changes in the circadian period caused by light intensity. Aschoff's Second Rule is often referred to as the "Circadian Rule," as is explains how light intensity can accelerate or delay an animal's internal clock depending on an animal's activity pattern Nevertheless, all three of Aschoff's Rules are essential in the study of chronobiology and provide both fundamental insights into how organisms synchronize their internal clocks with the environment and generalized rules in many chronobiologists' research. Below is a table that summarizes characteristics of the three rules in diurnal and nocturnal animals.

Table 1: Characteristics of Aschoff's Rules in diurnal and nocturnal animals

- τ: Circadian period
- α: Activity time
- ρ: Rest time
- DD: Constant darkness
- LL: Constant light

Aschoff's Rules	Diurnal Animals (Light-active)	Nocturnal Animals (Dark-active)
First Rule	τ_{DD} > 24 h	τ_{DD} < 24 h
Second Rule	α increases under LL α:ρ ratio and total amount of activity increase with increased light intensity α_{LL} > ρ_{LL}	α decreases under LL α:ρ ratio and total amount of activity decrease with increased light intensity α_{LL} < ρ_{LL}
Third Rule	τ_{LL} < τ_{DD}	τ_{LL} > τ_{DD}

== Models of entrainment ==
When attempting to model the entrainment of circadian period with the light-dark cycle, Aschoff and Pittendrigh conducted experiments assuming different parameters. Aschoff's Rules iterate the parametric model of entrainment, which assumes that gradual changes in the clock parameters are responsible for changing the circadian phase. Aschoff highlighted that circadian entrainment is a consequence of a change in velocity of the internal clock. Pittendrigh argued, however, that the circadian clock shifts phase instantaneously, suggesting nonparametric entrainment Pittendrigh studied the single instantaneous events of eclosion in Drosophila, while Aschoff studied the continuous modulation of activity in the circadian rhythms of birds, mammals, and humans.

While studies support both models of entrainment, a more recent model labeled the Circadian integrated Response Characteristic (CiRC) suggests the most accurate model for entrainment. The CiRC model relies on ordinary differential equations to parametrize the circadian rhythm and predict the phase of entrainment.

== Genetic mechanism of Aschoff's First Rule ==
According to Aschoff's First Rule, nocturnal animals have an increased intrinsic free-running period in LL (constant light). However, different inbred strains of mice (Mus musculus) have different manifestations of Aschoff's first rule: varying magnitudes of the lengthening of the free-running period in LL versus dim red light Mice with the shortest free-running period in dim red light tend to have the largest increase in the intrinsic period after exposure to bright light. The difference between mice strains under Mus genus indicates the genetic determinant of Aschoff's First Rule. This effect could be caused by different genetic makeup and the subsequent gene-imposed difference of light perception ability and circadian clock gene expression.

There has been evidence linking the expression of period2 gene to the manifestation of Aschoff's First Rule. A differential regulation of putative clock genes in mice seems to cause varying circadian behavior under LL. The relation is explained in Table 2.

Table 2: Genetic Evidence of Aschoff's First Rule in Mice

Gene	General Function	Relation To Aschoff's First Rule
Period2 (Per2)	PER2 codes for PER2 protein in mammals; Expressed in the Suprachiasmatic Nucleus (SCN), the primary circadian pacemaker for mammals; Mediate circadian rhythm	In LL(constant light), PER2 mRNA is rhythmic, but PER2 protein level is elevated and arrhythmic. Light alters PER2 protein; In DD(constant dark), both PER2 mRNA and PER2 protein levels are rhythmic; Mutation in PER2 gene causes the mice to violate Aschoff's First Rule

In the mammals, many Clock genes work together to mediate circadian rhythm and produce circadian oscillations. This oscillating gene pattern is also demonstrated in Drosophila melanogaster. The D. melanogaster Clock genes and their mammalian analogs are displayed in Table 3 below.

Table 3: Mammalian Circadian Genes vs. Drosophila Circadian Genes

Mammalian (mouse) Gene	D. melanogaster	Characteristics of Mutant
Clock	dClock	Longer period Constant conditions → Loss of rhythmicity
mPer1	Period	Lower amplitude/shortened period/loss of rhythm
mPer2	Period	Shorter period/loss of rhythm
mPer3	Period	Modest shortening of period
CKEє	Doubletime	Shortened period
mCry1/mCry2	dCry	mCry1 knockout → shorter period mCry2 knockout → longer period mCry1/mCry2 double knockout → arrhythmic
Bmal1	Cycle	Loss of rhythm

== Mammalian anatomy linked to Aschoff's Rules ==
Light reaches the mammalian circadian clock via the retinohypothalamic tract (RHT) pathway. This photic neural input pathway originates from intrinsically photosensitive retinal ganglion cells (ipRGCs) that contain melanopsin, a photopigment The axons of ipRGCs project through the optic nerve directly into the suprachiasmatic nucleus (SCN), the central mammalian pacemaker. This pathway is necessary for photoentrainment in mammals, and the SCN uses information from ipRGCs and environmental light cues to entrain the biological clock.

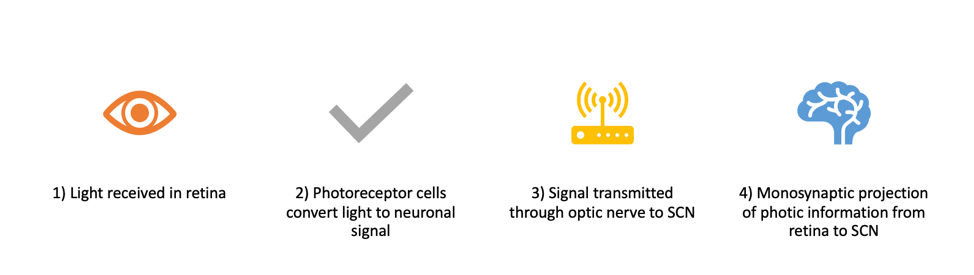
Light entrainment via the RHT pathway

Rods and cones are sufficient for photoentrainment, but not necessary, so mammals can entrain to light-dark cycles when other functional photoreceptors are present. This is demonstrated under LL, where mice without rods and cones free-run with an increased period as long as they express melanopsin in their retinal ganglion cells.

Melanopsin is also sufficient for the transfer of photic information to the SCN for entrainment. With an Opn4 knockout under LL conditions, mice express an increase in their free-running period. This evidence suggests that mammal melanopsin actively participates in the effects explained by Aschoff's Third Rule.

There is also evidence for light intensity having an effect on adherence to Aschoff's rules in mammals. Diurnal mammals are more sensitive to light intensity than nocturnal mammals, and lose rhythmicity at brighter light levels. This suggests that nocturnal mammals follow Aschoff's rules more consistently.

In mammals, the intergeniculate leaflet (IGL) also influences circadian rhythms. The IGL receives information from retinal ganglion cells, which is then transmitted to the SCN. Lesioning the IGL of hamsters in LL conditions prevents the lengthening of the free-running period. This suggests that the IGL is necessary for hamsters to follow Aschoff's Third Rule but is not necessary for entrainment and rather serves to regulate circadian responses to photic input

Table 4: Summary of Key Mammalian Anatomical Components and Lesion Effects

Anatomical Component	Function	Lesion Effects on Photoentrainment
RHT	Photic neural input pathway. Important for mammalian circadian rhythms. Origin: ipRGCs	Lesion in LD → loss of entrainment RHT is necessary for entrainment
SCN	Light information sent here through RHT. Functions as the master circadian clock. Center for circadian rhythmicity.	Arrhythmicity of free-running period SCN is necessary for entrainment
IGL	Receives retinal inputs and sends information to SCN.	Lesion in LL → reduced lengthening effects on period in free-running hamsters IGL is involved in but, not necessary for entrainment
ipRGCs	Transmits light signals to brain areas. Help control circadian rhythms and pupil reflexes.	Loss of entrainment ipRGCs are necessary for entrainment

== Violations and exceptions ==
Although Aschoff's Rules have provided a valuable framework in chronobiology, subsequent studies have identified a range of exceptions across species, highlighting the complexity and diversity of circadian systems in nature.

In a 1979 follow-up study, Aschoff noted that while many species conformed to the general patterns he previously outlined, certain deviations emerged under specific environmental conditions. In particular, he observed that the relationship between light intensity and the τ did not always follow a uniform trajectory. Aschoff reported that "a bimodal [decreasing-then-increasing] dependence of τ on I_{LL} [light intensity under constant light condition] could be characteristic for at least some species of night-active mammals," suggesting that the influence of light on circadian timing in these species may involve more complex regulatory mechanisms than originally proposed. He also found that, unlike the relatively uniform τ characteristics observed in night-active mammals and light-active birds, some light-active mammalian species exhibited substantial variability in their τ responses to changes in light intensity. These observations represent notable exceptions to Aschoff's Third Rule.

=== Violations specific to arthropods ===
Apart from certain species of mammals, violations and exceptions of Aschoff's Rules are more often observed among arthropods.

==== Violation of Aschoff's First Rule ====
- In onion flies, Delia antiqua, τ_{DD} changes with age. Their τ_{DD} is shorter than 24 hours until 14–20 days after adult eclosion; thereafter, it becomes longer than 24 hours.

==== Violation of Aschoff's Second Rule ====
- In the nocturnal beetle, Tenebrio molitor, a positive correlation between the α:ρ ratio and light intensity was observed, although τ increased when the beetle was transferred from DD to LL, which corresponded to Aschoff's Third Rule.

==== Violation of Aschoff's Third Rule ====
- In cockroaches, no obvious correlation was observed between τ and the intensity of illumination (in LL).
- In Velia currens, no systematic change of τ was observed when the intensity was raised from 0.1 to 700 lux .
- In the mainly light-active dung beetle, Geotrupes sylvaticus, τ lengthened in LL.
