= Eberhard Gwinner =

German ornithologist and zoologist (1938–2004)

Eberhard Gwinner (26 December 1938 – 7 September 2004) was a German ornithologist and founding director of the Max-Planck Institute for ornithology. He specialized in the study of annual rhythms, their endocrine control, and biological clocks in birds.

Gwinner was born in Stuttgart and educated at Ludwigsburg and Tübingen. He became interested in birds at a young age and published his first note at the age of 17. He received a doctorate from the University of Tübingen in 1964 with research on ravens under the guidance of Gustav Kramer and Konrad Lorenz. His post-doctoral studies with Jürgen Aschoff made him interested in the timing of migration and breeding. He worked in Zaire from 1965 to 1966. He began to research endocrinology with Donald Farner in Washington and examined circadian rhythms at Stanford with Colin Pittendrigh. In 1979 he became head of the Radolfzell observatory and in 1998 he founded the Max Planck Research Centre for Ornithology and served as its director until his death.

He conducted long-term experiments on captive stonechats (Saxicola torquata) and garden warblers (Sylvia borin), some kept for nearly twelve years, under controlled environmental conditions and demonstrated that there were endogenous annual rhythms in the body that continued to show even when the birds were maintained under constant and artificial day-night durations. He examined proximate control mechanisms such as melatonin secretion by the pineal gland and the response to photoperiod. He examined if photoperiod directly controlled rhythms or whether they merely synchronized the internal rhythms, acting as a "zeitgeber" (time-giver).
