= Biorhythm =

Biorhythm may refer to:

- Biorhythm (pseudoscience), developed by Wilhelm Fliess in the 19th century
- Biological rhythm, repetitive cycles that occur in biology, studied in the science of chronobiology

== See also ==
- Chronobiology
