= Biological rhythm =

Repetitive biological process

Biological rhythms are repetitive biological processes. Some types of biological rhythms have been described as biological clocks. They can range in frequency from microseconds to less than one repetitive event per decade. Biological rhythms are studied by chronobiology. In the biochemical context biological rhythms are called biochemical oscillations.

The variations of the timing and duration of biological activity in living organisms occur for many essential biological processes. These occur (a) in animals (eating, sleeping, mating, hibernating, migration, cellular regeneration, etc.), (b) in plants (leaf movements, photosynthetic reactions, etc.), and in microbial organisms such as fungi and protozoa. They have even been found in bacteria, especially among the cyanobacteria (aka blue-green algae, see bacterial circadian rhythms).

== Circadian rhythm ==
The best studied rhythm in chronobiology is the circadian rhythm, a roughly 24-hour cycle shown by physiological processes in all these organisms. The term circadian comes from the Latin circa, meaning "around" and dies, "day", meaning "approximately a day." It is regulated by circadian clocks.

The circadian rhythm can further be broken down into routine cycles during the 24-hour day:

- Diurnal, which describes organisms active during daytime
- Nocturnal, which describes organisms active in the night
- Crepuscular, which describes animals primarily active during the dawn and dusk hours (ex: white-tailed deer, some bats)

While circadian rhythms are defined as regulated by endogenous processes, other biological cycles may be regulated by exogenous signals. In some cases, multi-trophic systems may exhibit rhythms driven by the circadian clock of one of the members (which may also be influenced or reset by external factors). The endogenous plant cycles may regulate the activity of the bacterium by controlling availability of plant-produced photosynthate.

== Other cycles ==
Many other important cycles are also studied, including:

- Infradian rhythms, which are cycles longer than a day. Examples include circannual or annual cycles that govern migration or reproduction cycles in many plants and animals, or the human menstrual cycle.
- Ultradian rhythms, which are cycles shorter than 24 hours, such as the 90-minute REM cycle, the 4-hour nasal cycle, or the 3-hour cycle of growth hormone production.
- Tidal rhythms, commonly observed in marine life, which follow the roughly 12.4-hour transition from high to low tide and back.
- Lunar rhythms, which follow the lunar month (29.5 days). They are relevant e.g. for marine life, as the level of the tides is modulated across the lunar cycle.
- Gene oscillations – some genes are expressed more during certain hours of the day than during other hours.

Within each cycle, the time period during which the process is more active is called the acrophase. When the process is less active, the cycle is in its bathyphase or trough phase. The particular moment of highest activity is the peak or maximum; the lowest point is the nadir. How high (or low) the process gets is measured by the amplitude.

== Biochemical basis of biological rhythms ==
Goldbeter's book provides a thorough analysis of the biochemical mechanisms and their kinetic properties that underlie biological rhythms.
