= Bunker experiment =

Experiment studying human circadian clocks

The bunker experiment was a scientific experiment that began in 1966 to test whether humans, like other species, have an intrinsic circadian clock. It was started by Jürgen Aschoff and Rütger Wever of the Max Planck Institute for Behavioral Physiology and later taken over by Jürgen Zulley. Participants lived in a bunker for multiple weeks while scientists measured their daily rhythms in many variables. The main conclusion of the experiment was that humans have an intrinsic clock with a period greater than 24 hours. The experiment also established many features of this clock and paved the way for future circadian studies.

== Background ==
Before this experiment, scientists had already discovered that many plant and animal species have intrinsic clocks that can operate independently of external time cues. It is now known that these clocks operate based on molecular oscillations, using transcription-translation feedback loops and metabolic feedback loops. External cues, notably light, interact with this clock by entraining it to match the external time. However, before this experiment, some researchers speculated that human rhythms were driven by these external cues without influence from an internal clock.

To test the hypothesis that humans have an internal clock, Jürgen Aschoff and colleagues had a bunker of reinforced steel built in Andechs, Upper Bavaria, Germany. The bunker contained a bedroom, kitchen, and shower, but no windows, and many participants were students who used the time underground to study. Many participants found the idea of living in a bunker without time cues daunting, but most ended up enjoying the experiment. Aschoff was the first test subject, with Rütger Wever observing. The experiment began in 1966 and continued until the early 1980s. As of 2013, the bunker was still in existence, although quite dilapidated.

== Methods ==
The inside of the bunker was isolated from all time and light cues and subjects lived there for weeks at a time. Subjects prepared their own meals and were asked to eat three meals a day, not nap after lunch, and perform some psychological tasks. Besides this, they could generally do as they pleased, and were able to turn the lights on and off themselves. The bunker was separated from the outside world via two doors, only one of which could be opened at a time. Researchers would place food in the space between the doors, and the subject would leave urine samples here. The experimenters made deliveries at randomized times. The subject could communicate with the outside only through letters. Over about 20 years, the researchers studied various properties of the human biological clock, varying social interaction, light intensity, gong sounds, or electromagnetic radiation to test the impacts on circadian function. They also examined whether male and female clocks function differently. Many measurements were taken on subjects including their sleep-wake activity, bed movements, rectal temperature, urine samples, and time perception. To measure time perception, individuals were asked to press a buzzer at one hour intervals and a minute after the one hour mark.

== Results ==
=== Length of Intrinsic Period ===
The bunker experiment conducted by Aschoff demonstrated that the participants' urine excretion, rectal temperature, and circadian rhythm of activity all had a free running period of approximately 25 hours in the absence of external cues. Furthermore, it was established that men typically have a slightly longer period than women. More recent studies conducted suggest that the period of 25 hours found in this experiment may be attributed to the subject's ability to turn the lights on and off when they desire; in controlled lab conditions, researchers have found the human internal period to be approximately 24.2 hours.

=== Effect of Light Intensity ===
One variable tested in the bunker experiment was whether light intensity affected the period of the circadian rhythm. To examine this, Aschoff and colleagues manipulated the intensity of light from outside the bunker, exposing subjects to dim light (40 lux), then light of high intensity (200 lux) when the subjects chose to turn on the lights. It was established through these experiments that using intense light caused a decrease of approximately 0.7 hours to 1 hour in the period. When the intensity values were changed and the bright light tested before the dim light, the more intense light still gave a shorter period. Later experiments conducted by Wever using 3000 lux light established that the clock underwent a broader range of entrainment, or synchronization of the clock to external cues, when exposed to more intense light. He also discovered the suppression of melatonin in the presence of intense light, which provided information about the chemical factors that affect sleep.

=== Desynchronization ===
The bunker experiment also revealed that some individuals experience a desynchronization of their activity rhythms in relation to their body temperature; for some participants this occurred immediately when they entered the bunker and for other participants it took days to weeks of isolation. The period of the participants' core body temperature typically stayed near 25 hours while their sleep/wake cycle would adopt a different period, for example, the participant may sleep for 12 hours and stay active for 20 hours. This led Aschoff to believe that humans may have more than one circadian clock, however, the biological basis for desynchronization continues to be explored.

== Significance ==
This experiment provided evidence that humans have a circadian clock that can run independently from the 24-hour light-dark cycle and that different people can have unique rhythms.

The demonstration of the human circadian clock led to research that uncovered many of the mechanisms that underlie it. Desynchronization observed in this experiment was replicated by Aschoff and Wever in later experiments and used as evidence for a multi-oscillator model of circadian rhythm control. Scientists also studied the genetic basis of circadian rhythms. Ronald Konopka and Seymour Benzer discovered the period gene in 1971, which disrupted these rhythms when mutated in fruit flies. Jeffrey Hall, Michael Rosbash, and Michael Young uncovered the underlying cellular mechanism by which the period gene functions, research for which they received the Nobel Prize in Physiology or Medicine in 2017.

Many scientists have taken inspiration from the bunker experiment, performing a myriad of studies on the human circadian clock. Maroli Krishnayya Chandrashekaran and Geetha L. replicated Aschoff's findings in 1996 and also showed that the menstrual cycle in a human female in isolation was not coupled to the sleep-wake rhythm. A 2020 case study by Maria-Angeles Bonmati-Carrion and colleagues used a similar bunker protocol to study the human circadian clock in social and environmental isolation under light-dark conditions and in constant dim light, again finding free running periods longer than 24 hours in constant dim light.

The bunker experiment had far-reaching implications in the medical field, for example in understanding problems related to shift work and jet lag. In addition, it allowed for a better understanding of affective disorders in relation to the synchronization of the internal circadian clock and the light-dark and sleep-wake cycles.
