= Eclosion assay =

Procedure to study insect hatching or emergence from pupa

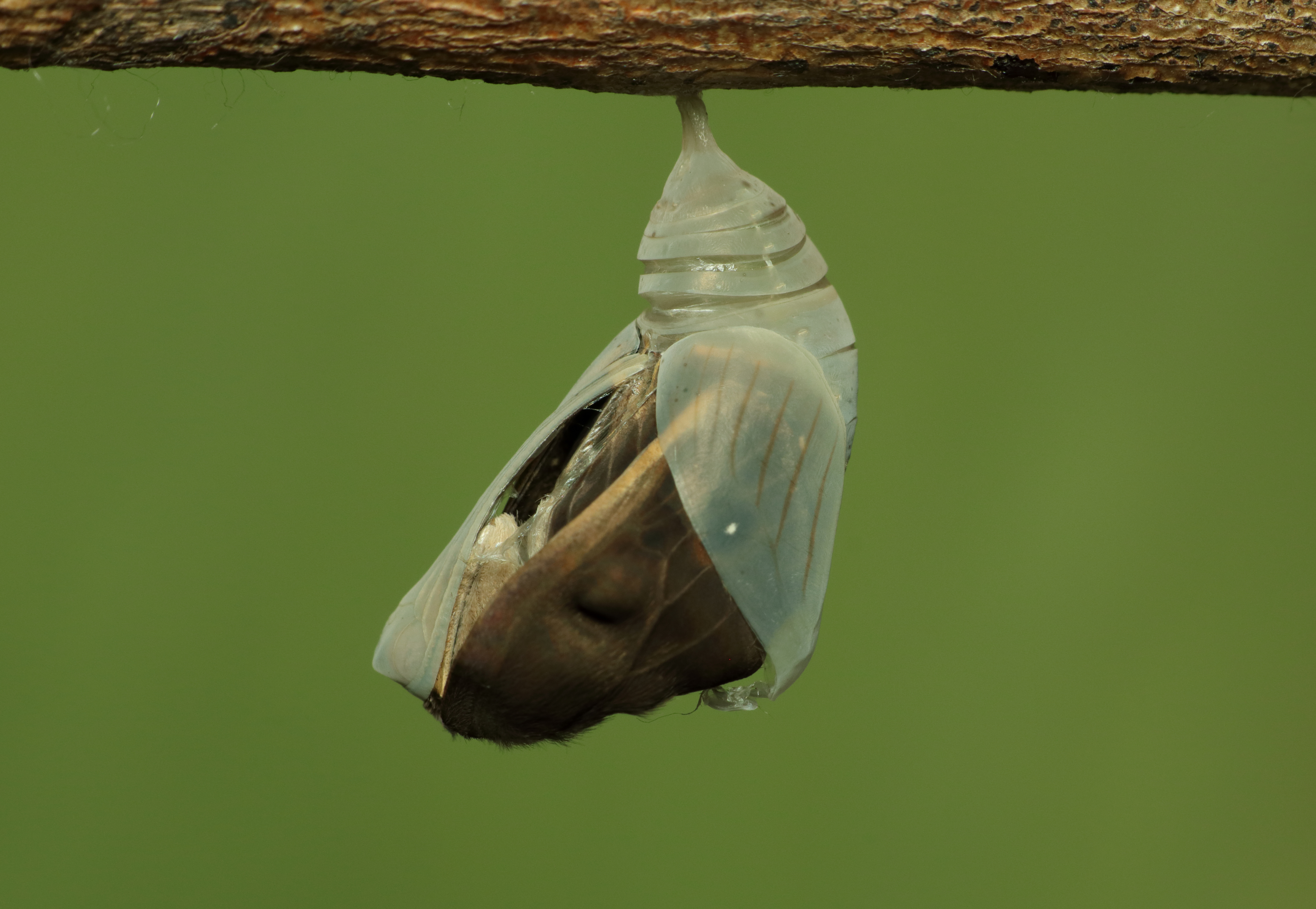
Eclosion (the process during which insects emerge from their pupae) is regulated by circadian clocks. Thus, chronobiologists use different assays to measure eclosion timing and circadian rhythms in insects.

Eclosion assays are experimental procedures used to study eclosion in insects, particularly in the model organism drosophila (fruit flies). Eclosion is the process in which an adult insect emerges from its pupal case, or a larval insect hatches from its egg. In holometabolous insects, the circadian clock regulates the timing of adult emergence. The daily rhythm of adult emergence in these insects was among the first circadian rhythms to be investigated. The circadian clock in these insects enforces a daily pattern of emergence by permitting or triggering eclosion during specific time frames and preventing emergence during other periods.

The purpose of an eclosion assay is to count the number of flies that emerge over time from a developing population, which provides information on the circadian clock in the experimentally manipulated drosophila. For example, with an eclosion monitor, scientists can study how knocking out a certain gene changes the behavioral expression of a drosophila's biological clock. Additionally, the circadian rhythm of adult insect emergence was among the earliest chronobiological phenomena to be examined, significantly impacting the field of chronobiology through its contributions to understanding temperature compensation, phase response curves, and reactions to skeleton photoperiods. The eclosion assay serves as a vital tool for researchers delving into chronobiology studies.

== Bang box ==
The bang box is the first experimental assay developed to measure eclosion in fruit flies. The first model of the bang box was developed at a Princeton University laboratory, mainly accredited to Colin Pittendrigh, to measure the time that adult drosophilids emerged from pupae populations in a controlled light and temperature environment. This original model works by securing pupae on plastic boxes that can be temperature controlled. The pupae are harvested and attached to a brass holding plate. The holding plate is then secured to face a brass mounting plate that can be temperature-controlled and then covered with an acrylic glass cover that has a tapered mouth. The tapered mouth is aligned above a vial containing detergent solution. The mounting plate is then placed atop a solenoid activated every 30 minutes. The vials of detergent are placed in a circular tray that is rotated at a rate of one vial per hour. The activation allows the mounting plate to be lifted and dropped against a rubber stopper that shakes out all of the emerging flies from the last 30 minutes into the vial of detergent. Researchers counted the number of flies in each vial to determine the times of day where eclosion activity was highest. Pittendrigh used this model to demonstrate that the circadian clock in drosophila is temperature-compensated (meaning its period is stable over a broad range of temperatures) and to design an early theoretical model for phase response curves.

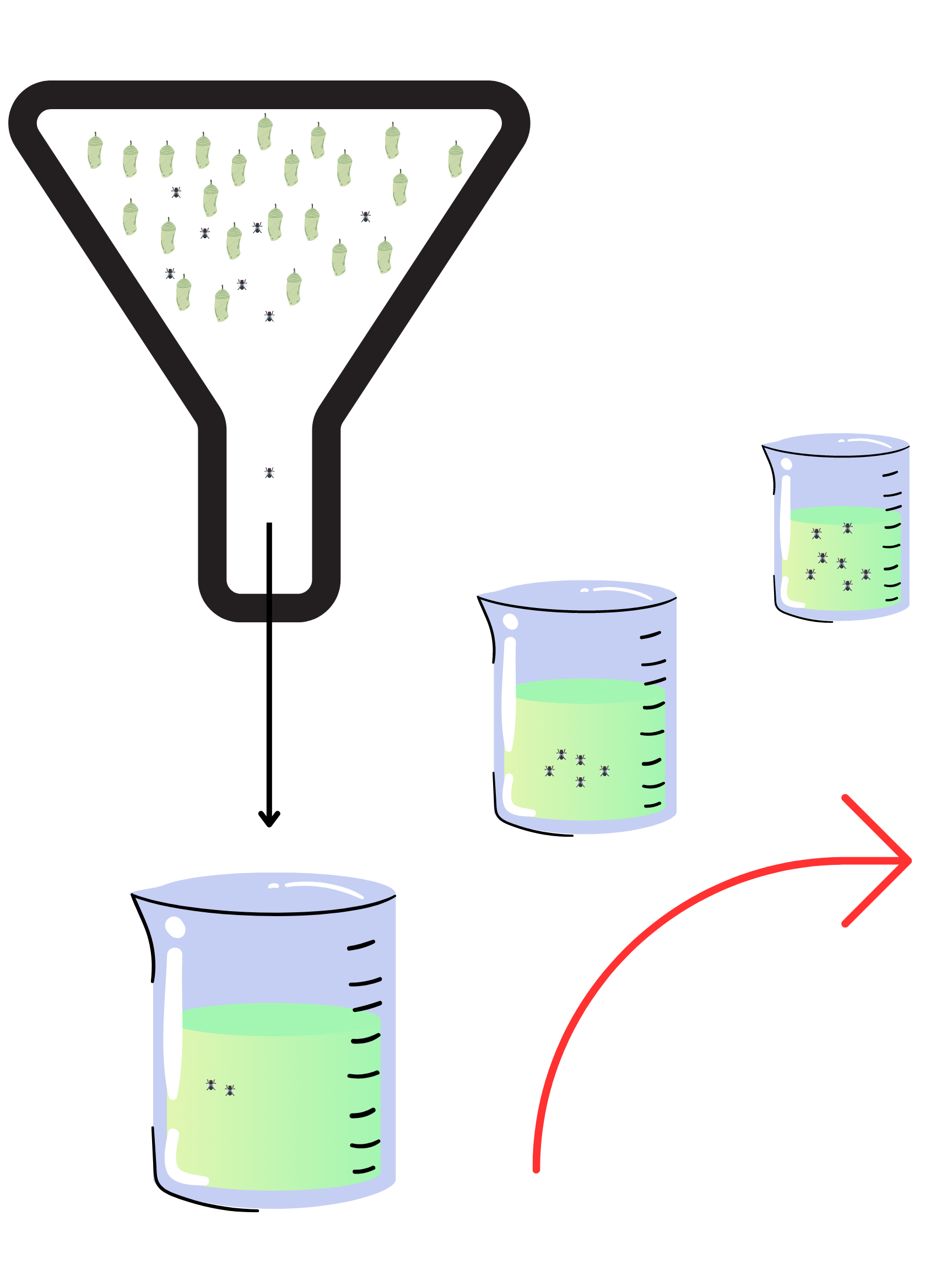
Simplified bang box schematic. Pupae (green) are held on a plate, and the container holding them is shaken at regular intervals to cause any eclosed flies (black) to fall into vials containing detergent. These vials are on a stage that also rotates at regular intervals (represented by the red arrow), which enables researchers to count the number of flies eclosed at each time interval.

The bang box was the primary means of investigation in chronobiology in the 1960s and 1970s. The application of this technique includes, but is not limited to:

- determining the impact of external stimuli on flies' internal biological clock,
- measuring the circadian rhythm of eclosion, and
- defining how gene alleles such as period genes contribute to the presence or shifts in the Drosophila circadian rhythm.

The bang box allows for visualization of what happens to circadian rhythms when a gene gets knocked out. Using this method, the researchers were able to collect a large data sample on the number of eclosed individuals every fixed time period. Furthermore, the bang box was used by Pittendrigh earlier to conclude that the oscillation phase assay is affected by the phase response curve. Later research builds on this relationship in order to use eclosion assays to study circadian rhythms. For example, the bang box was used to measure eclosion activity in order to determine Clock mutants on the X chromosome of Drosophila that drastically change the period of the traditional 24-hour circadian rhythm.

== Modern systems ==
Some modern eclosion monitors employ infrared counting electronics. In these systems, the pupae are glued to an elevated disk just as in the original bang box, and emerging flies fall into one tube due to gravity. The flies fall through infrared lasers in the base, which contain electronics to record the timing of eclosion. This technique has been used as recently as 2021 to evaluate how the central circadian clock regulates eclosion by coupling to an endocrine pacemaker in the prothoracic gland.

Some scientists have argued that this model, while more advanced than the former bang box construct, fails to account for changes in temperature and light exposure present in most flies' natural environments. To address these issues, scientists at the University of Würzburg designed an open eclosion monitor where pupae and flies are exposed to abiotic factors in the environment. Cameras above the eclosion plate record images of the flies when they emerge from their pupae. This monitor can also track eclosion by recording the increase in light intensity when the dark pupae is split open during eclosion, which allows light from below the plate to reach the camera. Similar imaging systems have been used to measure eclosion as well other Drosophila life events, such as pupariation and death.

== Methods in other organisms ==
Measurements of eclosion in non-Drosorganisms have been used in various studies to study chronobiology and circadian rhythms. While Drosophila is the species that has traditionally been studied in chronobiology experiments, there have been similar experiments conducted with other organisms. The eclosion of the Indian meal moth Plodia interpunctella has been studied with tools similar to the bang box in order to examine the effects of temperature on circadian rhythms. Nondiapausing larvae of the Indian meal moth have been used to study eclosion rhythms by counting the number of adults emerging from the food within a few minutes at one-hour intervals. In a 2012 study conducted by researchers at the University of Toyama, the number of emerging adults was pooled together in daily recordings in order to analyze the eclosion rhythms of the moths. The number of insects that emerged at different time points was recorded when the larvae were exposed to various temperatures, and thus, this method was used to conclude that eclosion rhythms of the Indian meal moths are temperature-compensated.

Moths were also used in experiments studying the effects of eclosion hormones on chronobiology. These experiments indirectly studied eclosion by looking at the plasticization of the wing cuticles of tobacco hornworm moths, Manduca sexta. Because the plasticization of the cuticles makes the wings of the moths inextensible until three to four hours before emergence, scientists are able to study the cuticles in order to ultimately study eclosion. In these studies, wing extensibility is measured by observing the increase of two marks on the wing, and eclosion hormone activity is measured through bioassays. Thus, the combination of these two measurements allows for conclusions regarding how an eclosion hormone is related to eclosion, along with the plasticization of wing cuticle.
