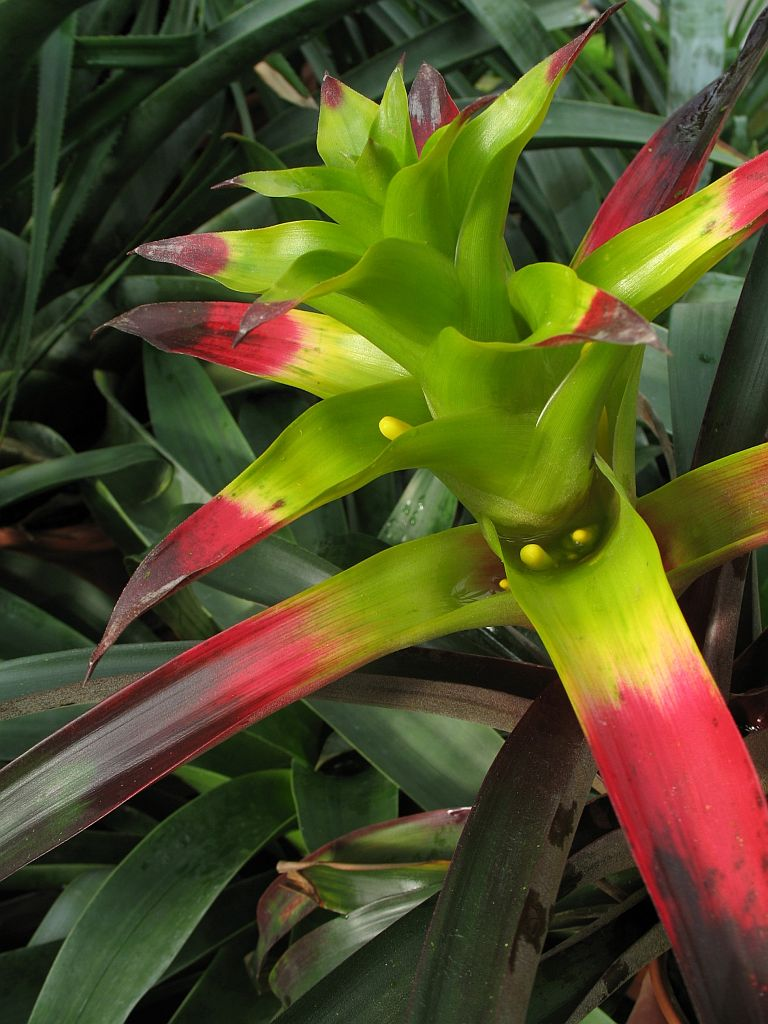

Scientific classification
- Kingdom: Plantae
- Clade: Embryophytes
- Clade: Tracheophytes
- Clade: Spermatophytes
- Clade: Angiosperms
- Clade: Monocots
- Clade: Commelinids
- Order: Poales
- Family: Bromeliaceae
- Genus: Guzmania
- Species: G. squarrosa

Binomial name
- Guzmania squarrosa (Mez & Sodiro) L.B.Sm. & Pittendr.

Synonyms
- Homotypic Synonyms: Thecophyllum squarrosum Mez & Sodiro; Heterotypic Synonyms: Guzmania cryptantha L.B.Sm.; Guzmania cryptantha var. pauciflora L.B.Sm.; Guzmania kressii H.Luther & K.F.Norton; Guzmania squarrosa f. lutea Oliva-Esteve

= Guzmania squarrosa =

Species of flowering plant

Guzmania squarrosa is a species of flowering plant in the family Bromeliaceae. This species is native to Bolivia, Colombia, Ecuador, Guyana, Peru, and Venezuela.

== Cultivars ==
- Guzmania 'Denise'
- Guzmania 'Rachel'
