= Erwin Bünning =

German biologist (1906–1990)

- Born: January 23, 1906; Hamburg, Germany
- Died: October 4, 1990 (aged 84); Tübingen, Germany
- Education: University of Göttingen; Humboldt University of Berlin
- Known for: Model of plant photoperiodism
- Spouse: Eleonore Bünning
- Children: 4
- Parents: Heinrich Bünning; Hermine Winkler
- Scientific career
- Fields: chronobiology; botany
- Workplaces: University of Jena; University of Königsberg; University of Strasbourg; University of Cologne; University of Tübingen

Erwin Bünning (23 January 1906 – 4 October 1990) was a German biologist. His most famous contributions were to the field of chronobiology, where he proposed a model for the endogenous circadian rhythms governing plant photoperiodism. From these contributions, Bünning is considered a co-founder of chronobiology along with Jürgen Aschoff and Colin Pittendrigh.

== Life ==
=== Early life and education ===
Bünning was born on 23 January 1906 in Hamburg, Germany to Heinrich Bünning and Hermine Bünning (born Winkler). A teacher of German, English, mathematics, and biology, Bünning's father was the primary academic influence on Erwin's early life, passing on to Erwin a passion for botany. Bünning received his primary education in Hamburg from 1912-1925. Bünning then attended the University of Göttingen and the University of Berlin from October 1925-July 1928, where he studied biology, chemistry, physics, and philosophy. Bünning earned his Doctorate of Philosophy from the University of Berlin in May 1929. During this time, Bünning married his wife Eleonore; the two would later have four children.

=== Academic career ===
In 1930, Bünning took an assistantship under Otto Renner at the University of Jena, then one of Germany's largest botanical institutes. During the rise of the Nazi Party in Germany in the early 1930s, Renner stood in open opposition to the Nazis, publicly defending Jewish scientists. Similarly, Bünning was considered a communist sympathizer, a stance likely influenced by Bünning's father, a Social Democrat opposed to the Nazis. Bünning's political beliefs created tension between him and some of his students. In response to this tension, Bünning left Jena for a lectureship at the East Prussian University of Königsberg. In 1936, Bünning published his model for plant photoperiodism, wherein he proposed that endogenous (internal) circadian rhythms enable plants to measure day length. Bünning's model of photoperiodism would go largely unnoticed by the scientific community until 1960 when he chaired the 1960 Cold Spring Harbor Symposium on Biological Clocks. There, Colin Pittendrigh drew attention to Bünning's work and named his 1936 model on plant photoperiodism the Bünning hypothesis.

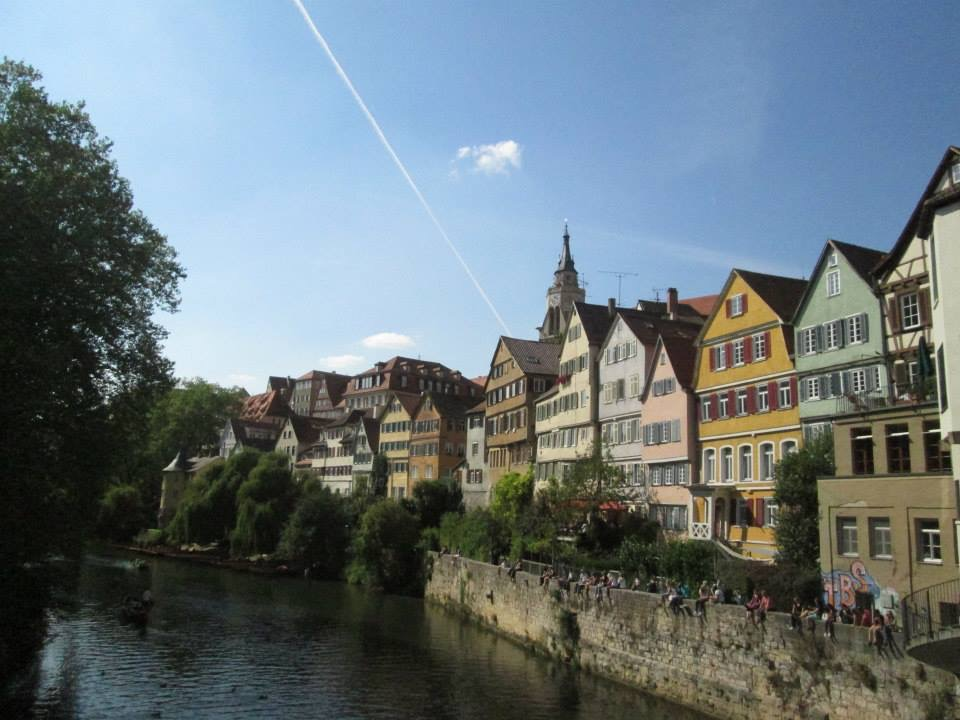
Bünning spent most of his academic career at the University of Tübingen

In 1938, Bünning spent a year traveling through Java and Sumatra. His observations on the islands resulted in the book Tropische Regenwalder (Tropical Rainforests). Upon his return to Germany in 1939, Bünning was conscripted in the German military (World War II). Military authorities appointed Bünning as an associate professor at the University of Strasbourg. After the war, Bünning became a full professor at the University of Cologne in 1945 before moving to the University of Tübingen the next year (1946), where he stayed until his retirement in 1971. At Tübingen, Bünning entered into the workspace of his role model Wilhelm Pfeffer, the man who postulated in 1875 that the orientation of plants in space changes with the time of day. Bünning would later publish a biography on Pfeffer.

=== Later life and legacy ===
Over his career, Bünning published over 260 papers in the fields of plant physiology and general biology, as well as a very popular textbook on plant physiology. Bünning died on 4 October 1990 in Tübingen, Germany, after contracting pneumonia. Following his death, the German newspaper Schwäbisches Tagblatt described Bünning as one of the greatest botanists of the 20th century.

== Key contributions ==
=== Historical context ===
Changes in the positioning of plant leaves over the course of the day were observed as early as the 4th century B.C. by Androsthenes, Alexander the Great’s historian. This phenomenon, however, was not researched further until 1729 when Jean-Jacques d'Ortous de Mairan provided experimental data that mimosa plants close their leaves at night, a movement that persists rhythmically in constant darkness. In 1875, Wilhelm Pfeffer, Bünning’s role model, put forward that these movements might be controlled by an endogenous biological clock. This theory formed the foundation for Bünning’s later work.

Prior to Bünning’s work, the prevailing hypothesis on circadian rhythms was the "hourglass" hypothesis, which postulates that circadian rhythmicity within an organism is entirely driven by the external light-dark cycle and that an organism's "hourglass" is reset each day. Bünning, however, proposed that biological clocks are endogenous and synchronize to daily stimuli. Unlike in the hourglass hypothesis, Bünning's hypothesis proposes that circadian rhythmicity derives from an interaction between light and a circadian pacemaker, not external stimuli alone. The general premise of Bünning's hypothesis became a model for circadian time keeping across species off of which many chronobiologists, even into the present, base their models.

=== Experiments ===
In the early-1930s, Bünning proposed that organisms rely on a circadian rhythm of sensitivity to light to measure photoperiod. He demonstrated that plants open and close their leaves and insects eclose according to circadian rhythms, even in continuous light or darkness. His crossing experiments with bean plants of different periods in 1935 demonstrated that the next generation had periods of intermediate durations, supporting the suggestion that circadian rhythms are heritable. Bünning also demonstrated that an artificial photoperiod can induce flowering at inappropriate times, supporting his model of endogenous oscillators entrained to external stimuli. To create artificial photoperiods, Bünning exposed plants to a light-dark cycle indicative of a specific season, such as the long days and short nights of summer. By entraining the plants to a spring or summer photoperiod, Bünning was able to induce flowering, even if the actual season were fall or winter. From his results, Bünning proposed that biological clocks have sensors for both light and dark, and their relationship aids photoperiodic timekeeping.

His published works provided key synthesis of existing evidence for biological clocks across species, including plants, flies, and fungi. His 1958 work, "The Physiological Clock", was hailed as a milestone in the field of chronobiology, and his later works on plant physiology helped apply his work on photoperiodism to practical uses. In 1935 he demonstrated that plants with different inherent periods would become desynchronized in constant conditions. This work provided evidence for the dismissal of the "Factor X" hypothesis, which held that circadian rhythms were not endogenous, and were instead reliant on an unknown external stimulus, some "Factor X."

=== Bünning's model ===
Bünning was the pioneer of the "Bünning Hypothesis," later known as the External Coincidence model. This model proposed a circadian rhythm of photoperiodic photosensitivity in plants. As day length increases with the spring and summer seasons, for example, light hits a plant's photosensitive phase, triggering a physiological or behavioral response. The Bünning Hypothesis proposed that light has two functions for an organism:

1. Light is the primary Zeitgeber for the synchronization of biological rhythms.

2. Light triggers photoinductive responses during certain phases of the circadian cycle.

== Honors ==
Bünning received many honors in his life both in the field of chronobiology and botany. In 1960, he chaired in the 25th Cold Spring Harbor Symposium, "Biological Clocks". The next year, Bünning was elected Corresponding Member of the Botanical Society of America. During his life he was also elected honorary member of the Japanese Botanical Society, the German Botanical Society, the American Society of Plant Physiologists, and the Swiss Botanical Society. He became an elected member of the American Philosophical Society, the Heidelberg Academy for Sciences and Humanities, the Bavarian Academy of Sciences and Humanities, and the German Academy of Scientists, Leopoldina. In addition, he was elected a Foreign Associate of the American National Academy of Sciences (1968), Foreign Member of the Royal Society of London, and an Honorary Fellow of the Indian Academy of Sciences (1986).

In 1973 Bünning won the Charles Reid Barnes Life Membership Award for "meritorious work in plant biology." The Universities of Glasgow (1974), Freiburg (1976), and Erlangen (1977) conferred honorary doctorates on him, as did the University of Göttingen Bünning is considered by many to be the father of the field of chronobiology. His work on measuring the free-running period of plant rhythms and experiments with cross-breeding strains of plants with different periods aided in the development of that field. Bünning was invited by M. K. Chandrashekaran to India in 1978, to conduct the Biological Oscillation workshop in Madurai Kamaraj University.

== Selected publications ==
- Uber die Erblichkeit der Tagesperiodizitat bei den Phaseolus-Blattern (1932)
- Die endogene Tagesperiodik als Grundlage der photoperiodischen Reaktion (1936)
- Entwicklungs und Bewegungsphysiologie der Pflanze (1948)
- In den Waldern Nordsumatras: Reisebuch eines Biologen (In the North Sumatran Forests : Travels of a Biologist, 1949)
- Die physiologische Uhr ("The Physiological Clock", 1958)
- Biological clocks; Chairman's Address; Cold Spring Harbor Symposium (1960)
- Interference of Moonlight with the Photoperiodic Measurement of Time by Plants, and their Adaptive Reaction (1969, With Ilse Moser)
- Wilhelm Pfeffer: Apotheker, Chemiker, Botaniker, Physiologe 1845–1920 (1975)
- Pfeffer's views on rhythms (1975, With M K Chandrashekaran)
- Fifty years of research in the wake of Wilhelm Pfeffer (1977)

== See also ==
- Chronobiology
- Circadian rhythms
- Photoperiodism
- Colin Pittendrigh
- Jürgen Aschoff
