= Gwinner =

Gwinner may refer to:

- Gwinner, North Dakota, an American city
- Clive Gwinner (1908–1998), British naval officer
- Eberhard Gwinner (1938–2004), German ornithologist

== See also ==
- Gwinner–Roger Melroe Field, an airport in North Dakota
