= Circaseptan =

Biological rhythm of about 7 days

A circaseptan rhythm is a cycle consisting of approximately 7 days in which many biological processes of life, such as cellular immune system activity, resolve.

== See also ==
- Circadian rhythm
- Chronobiology
