= Franz Halberg =

American chronobiologist (1919–2013)

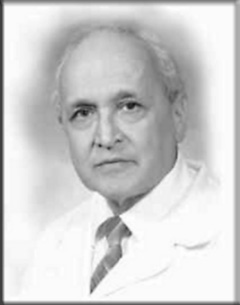
- Born: July 5, 1919; Romania
- Died: June 9, 2013 (aged 93); Minneapolis, Minnesota, U.S.
- Education: M.D.
- Occupation: Professor
- Employer: University of Minnesota
- Known for: Chronobiology
- Website: Halberg Chronobiology Center

Franz Halberg (July 5, 1919 – June 9, 2013 ) was a scientist and one of the founders of modern chronobiology. He first began his experiments in the 1940s and later founded the Chronobiology Laboratories at the University of Minnesota. Halberg published many papers also in the serials of the History Commission of International Association of Geomagnetism and Aeronomy. He also published in "Wege zur Wissenschaft, Pathways to Science". He was a member of many international bodies, was awarded five honorary doctorates and was a member of the Leibniz Sozietät der Wissenschaften zu Berlin. In the 1950s, he introduced the word circadian, which derives from the Latin about (circa) a day (diem).

== Nominations for the Nobel Prize ==
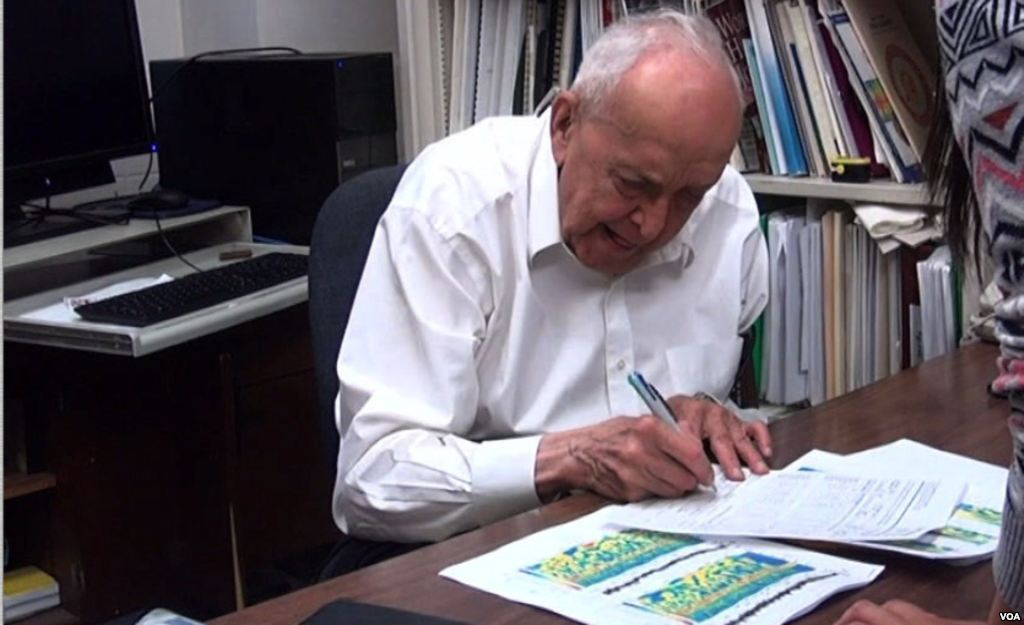
The doctor in 2012, aged 93.

Halberg was nominated several times for the Nobel Prize in Physiology or Medicine. In 1988, and again in 1989, upon invitation by Professor Björn Nordenström of the Karolinska Institute in Sweden, then a member of the Nobel committee, Germaine Cornelissen, close associate of Halberg, nominated Halberg for the prize, highlighting the different ingredients contributed by Franz in developing the discipline of chronobiology. Nordenström had come to the University of Minnesota to give a major lecture and accepted Halberg's invitation to come and visit his laboratory. The invitation was extended upon Nordenström's return to Sweden, at the Minneapolis airport where Halberg and Cornelissen had accompanied him to continue discussions of work of mutual interest. After Nordenström left the committee, Halberg's dossier assembled by Cornelissen was handed over to Dr. Dora K. Hayes of the U.S. Department of Agriculture, who had a colleague eligible to make nominations.
