= Malcolm von Schantz =

Academic and researcher at Northumbria University (UK)

Malcolm von Schantz FLS (24th May 1966 - 24th Oct 2025) was a professor of chronobiology at Northumbria University. His research related to circadian rhythms and sleep in human beings and its molecular determinants. He was a Special Visiting Scientist at the University of São Paulo School of Medicine and a fellow of the Linnean Society. He was part of the international team that determined that urbanisation and electricity are not to blame for sleep loss.

== Selected publications ==
- From Genes to Genomes: Concepts and Applications of DNA Technology. Wiley-Blackwell, 2007. (With Jeremy W. Dale) ISBN 978-0470017340
