= Zeitgeber =

Factors that can affect sleeping cycles

A zeitgeber (/ˈ(t)saɪtɡeɪbər, ˈzaɪt-/ (T)SYTE-gay-bər, ZYTE-, German: [ˈtsaɪtˌɡeːbɐ]) is any external or environmental cue that entrains or synchronizes an organism's biological rhythms, usually naturally occurring and serving to entrain to the Earth's 24-hour light/dark and 12-month cycles.

== History ==
The term Zeitgeber (lit. 'time giver') was first used by Jürgen Aschoff, one of the founders of the field of chronobiology. His work demonstrated the existence of endogenous (internal) biological clocks, which synchronize biological rhythms. In addition, he found that certain exogenous (external) cues, which he called zeitgeber, influence the timing of these internal clocks.

== Photic and nonphotic zeitgebers ==
- Light, the most potent regulator of circadian rhythms
- Atmospheric conditions
- Medication
- Temperature
- Social interactions
- Exercise
- Eating/drinking patterns

== Circadian rhythms ==
Any biological process in the body that repeats itself over a period of approximately 24 hours and maintains this rhythm in the absence of external stimuli is considered a circadian rhythm. It is believed that the brain's suprachiasmatic nucleus (SCN), or internal pacemaker, is responsible for regulating the body's biological rhythms, influenced by a combination of internal and external cues. To maintain synchrony between the internal clock and the external environment, zeitgebers, such as the sun rising, cause wakefulness in humans. This ability to align behaviors such as feeding and activity to the external environmental cycle is a process called entrainment.

Biological rhythms, including cycles related to sleep and wakefulness, mood, and cognitive performance, are synchronized with the body's internal circadian clock. The best way to observe the workings of this clock is to experimentally deprive individuals of external cues like light and social interaction and allow the body to experience a "free-running" environment – that is, one in which there are no zeitgebers to influence the body's rhythms. Under these circumstances, the circadian clock alone modulates the body's biological rhythms. Normally however, external cues like light-dark cycles and social interactions also exert an influence on the body's rhythms. These zeitgebers do so by alerting individuals to changes in the likelihood of possible rewards or threats in the environment, or allow individuals to anticipate predictable changes in their environment. For example, mice, which are prey organisms, are inactive during the day to avoid predation from predators, which are more active during the day. There is also increased competition for resources during the day, so mice will start to become active as night approaches to both successfully obtain resources for survival and avoid predation.

Early research into circadian rhythms demonstrated that, when humans are without zeitgebers, or in constant lighting conditions, they have a "free running" period of 24.9 hours. In this experiment, humans were in an underground, sound-proof bunker where the lights were continuously on. The subjects prepared their own meals and took their own samples, so there were no social interaction cues either. Humans therefore adjust from 24.9 hr internal rhythm to the 24-hour day.

There are many different zeitgebers, and their relative influence on an individual at any given time depends on a number of factors, time of day the zeitgeber is presented and the intensity of that zeitgeber. For example, Jürgen Aschoff showed that individuals can compensate for the absence of some zeitgebers like natural light by attending to social zeitgebers instead. Specifically, individuals placed in total darkness for four days did not differ on a variety of measures, including body temperature and various psychomotor tasks like time estimation and finger tapping, from individuals placed in an artificial light-dark environment when both groups were given the same strict time schedule. Researchers concluded that social zeitgebers, like meal times and interactions with other people, can entrain biological rhythms in ways similar to those of other common zeitgebers like light.

== Psychological effects of changes ==
Since the internal clock sets itself using zeitgebers, the loss or disruption of an individual's usual zeitgebers can be very disorienting. When an individual experiences significant changes in zeitgebers, such as being irregularly scheduled for the night shift, those changes can have a variety of negative effects. One example of this phenomenon is jetlag, in which traveling to another time zone causes desynchronization in sleep-wake cycles, appetite, and emotions. Such zeitgeber disruptions can also lead to decreased cognitive performance, negative mood, and in some cases, episodes of mental illness.

=== Cognitive performance ===
Researchers have shown that the 24-hour circadian clock also influences cognitive performance in a wide variety of paradigms, including serial search, verbal reasoning, working memory tasks, suppressing wrong answers, and manual dexterity. Performance on these tasks varies over the course of a day, with each type of task having a unique daily rhythm. For example, the best time to perform a working memory task tends to be midday, while immediate memory is best in the morning, and simple processing is ideally performed in the evening. In addition, individual differences among participants can have an effect on daily rhythms in performance. Studies have found that children perform mental math exercises most successfully in the morning, but young adults' performance peaks in the evening. This variation in the performance of various tasks is attributable to a number of factors, including relative working memory load, change in strategy, hemispheric dominance, ability to suppress wrong answers, age, level of practice, and morningness-eveningness, many of which fluctuate according to time of day. Based on these findings, researchers conclude that factors that disturb circadian rhythms can also affect cognitive performance.

=== Mood disorders ===
Disturbances in zeitgebers can exert a negative influence on emotion and mood as well as cognitive functioning. The disturbance of biological rhythms by zeitgebers is theorized to increase risk for some forms of psychopathology. There is strong evidence that individuals with depression experience irregular biological rhythms, including disrupted sleep-wake cycles, temperature, and cortisol rhythms. These findings support the theory first proposed by Ehlers, Frank, and Kupfer in 1988 that says that stressful life events can lead to depressive episodes by disrupting social and biological rhythms, leading to negative symptoms like sleep disturbance that can trigger depression in vulnerable individuals. Recent work has also demonstrated that interventions like light therapy, sleep deprivation, and some pharmacological antidepressants may be effective in treating depression by reordering these rhythms to their natural state. Such interventions influence an individual's mood, body temperature, cortisol levels, and melatonin production, all of which appear to be irregular in depressed individuals.

==== Social zeitgebers and mood disorders ====
Some researchers have suggested that the disturbances in biological rhythms present in depressed individuals may actually be the result of previous disruptions in social interactions, which serve as cues for those rhythms. This possibility may help to explain the relationship between stressful life events and the development of mood disorders. For example, newly married or cohabiting couples often need to adjust to each other's sleeping rhythms when beginning to share the same bed for the first time. This adjustment can be difficult and may lead to disruptions in sleep quality and quantity, and possibly increase risk for depression as a result. Researchers have attempted to explore the effect that life events that disturb social rhythms might have on depressive symptoms in a number of ways. A number of studies have looked at whether the loss of a spouse, a significant negative life event often associated with increased depressive symptoms, might lead to increased depression via disrupted social rhythms. In addition to grief, bereaved spouses may also be dealing with changes in numerous social zeitgebers. For instance, bereaved spouses may suddenly be faced with changes in meal times, responsibilities for additional chores, social expectations, or simply the reality of living day to day without one's usual conversational partner. Taken together, findings from studies on bereaved spouses indicate that when bereavement is associated with changes in social rhythms, depressive symptoms are likely to increase; however, if bereaved individuals are able to maintain social rhythms after the death of their spouse, increased depression is less likely. These findings suggest that social rhythm stability may not be entirely dependent on life events, but rather has some traitlike elements as well, since some individuals may be more likely to maintain social rhythms than others following the occurrence of a significant life event.

As of the year 2000, studies have also found a connection between the disruption of social rhythms and the triggering of manic episodes in bipolar disorder. Differentiating between zeitgeber disturbances that lead to depression and those that lead to manic episodes has proven difficult. However, in both unipolar and bipolar depression, the concept of social zeitgebers as potential risk factors has influenced the development of interventions to address this risk. For bipolar disorder, Interpersonal and Social Rhythm Therapy (IPSRT) is meant to regulate and normalize an individual's social rhythms, including meal times, personal relationships, exercise, and social demands. By regulating social rhythms, therapists hope to normalize in turn individuals' biological rhythms. Studies have not found much evidence that IPSRT improves mood, but individuals undergoing IPSRT experience longer periods between bipolar episodes, indicating that normalizing social rhythms may have a preventative effect.

==== Seasonal affective disorder ====
Seasonal affective disorder may occur as a result of deficiencies in zeitgebers (such as light) during the winter months that stimulate the reward activation system, resulting in a depressed mood. Some studies have pointed to the hormone melatonin, which is regulated by circadian rhythms, as a possible mechanism. Because circadian clocks synchronize human sleep-wake cycles to coincide with periods of the day during which reward potential is highest – that is, during the daytime – and recent studies have determined that daily rhythms in reward activation in humans are modulated by circadian clocks as well, external influences on those rhythms may influence an individual's mood.

== See also ==
- Infradian rhythm
- Phase response curve
- Ultradian rhythm
