= Jürgen Aschoff =

German physician, biologist and behavioral physiologist

- Born: 25 January 1913; Freiburg Im Breisgau, Germany
- Died: 12 October 1998 (aged 85); Freiburg Im Breisgau, Germany
- Education: University of Bonn
- Known for: Aschoff's Rule, Aschoff–Wever model
- Scientific career
- Fields: Chronobiology
- Workplaces: University of Göttingen; Max Planck Institute for Medical Research; Max Planck Institute for Behavioral Physiology

Jürgen Walther Ludwig Aschoff (January 25, 1913 – October 12, 1998) was a German physician, biologist and behavioral physiologist. Together with Erwin Bünning and Colin Pittendrigh, he is considered to be a co-founder of the field of chronobiology.

Aschoff's work in the field of chronobiology introduced ideas of light interactions in the circadian rhythms of nocturnal and diurnal species as summarized by Aschoff's Rules.

== Life ==
Aschoff was born in Freiburg Im Breisgau, the fifth child of pathologist Ludwig Aschoff (known for discovering the Aschoff-Tawara or atrioventricular node) and his wife Clara. He grew up in the liberal but morally strict world of Prussian academia. After the Abitur at a humanistic high school, he – according to his own statement "lacking a specific interest" – studied medicine at the University of Bonn, where he joined the Burschenschaft (fraternity) Alemannia Bonn. Aschoff's scientific career began in 1938, when he moved to the University of Göttingen to study thermoregulation physiology with Hermann Rein. In 1944, he received the venia legendi. He then became a professor at the University of Göttingen in 1949.

In 1952, his mentor, Hermann Rein, was appointed director of the Max Planck Institute for Medical Research in Heidelberg. Rein brought Aschoff to the Institute as a collaborator to study circadian rhythms in humans, birds, and mice. Aschoff then moved to the Max Planck Institute for Behavioral Physiology in Andechs to work with Gustav Kramer, who showed time-compensated sun-compass navigation in birds, and Erich von Holst, who studied physiological oscillators. From 1967 to 1979, he was a director at the Max Planck Institute for Behavioral Physiology and a professor in Munich. Aschoff was a scientific member and a member of the Kollegiums of the Max Planck Institute for Behavior Physiology, as well as senator of the Max Planck Society from 1972 to 1976.

Aschoff was known as an excellent lecturer with a booming voice, and he took a special interest in creating a scientific community and encouraging young scientists. After his retirement in 1983 and return to Freiburg, Aschoff continued his scientific work in the form of further publications. Jürgen Aschoff died in 1998 aged 85 after a short illness, only ten months after his beloved wife, Hilde, died.

== Work ==
Aschoff provided a strong foundation for the field of chronobiology through his research on circadian rhythms and entrainment in many different organisms such as rats, mice, birds, macaques, monkeys, and humans. His early research focused on understanding the properties of circadian rhythms and how these rhythms can change in response to stimuli. His later work was more applicable to pathologies, such as psychiatric disorders and dangers of shift work schedules, which can result from manipulating specific Zeitgebers.

=== Early work ===
Aschoff began his research on the physiology of thermoregulation by self-experimentation. He discovered that there was a 24-hour rhythm of variation in body temperature. After these experiments, he began investigating the basic mechanisms of circadian rhythm. In the 1950s, he met and began to collaborate with Erwin Bünning and Colin Pittendrigh. Aschoff began further experimentation studying the circadian rhythms of birds and mice under constant conditions. His results led to the conclusion that the circadian oscillations of biological processes were innate and did not require prior exposure to a 24-hour day to be expressed.

Aschoff also applied these methods to experiments with human circadian rhythms by building an underground "bunker" to isolate human subjects from any external environmental cues. Subjects placed in this bunker were allowed to turn lights on or off according to their own internal rhythms. After over twenty years of tracking sleep-wake cycles, body temperature, urine output, and other physiological and behavioral outputs, Aschoff and his collaborator Rütger Wever concluded that humans have endogenous circadian oscillators. This discovery has become the foundation for our understanding of many medical problems such as aging, sleep disorders, and jet lag.

Colin Pittendrigh is commonly thought to be the first researcher to study chronobiology in modern times. He studied fruit flies in the 1950s, and his mentee, Jürgen Aschoff, studied humans in the 1960s. In 1960, Aschoff coined the term Zeitgeber (from German for "time giver" or "synchronizer") to refer to external, environmental cues that synchronize an endogenous oscillator to the environmental cycle. To investigate the properties of natural endogenous oscillators, Aschoff exposed organisms to constant conditions without Zeitgeber cues (either constant light or constant darkness). The observations from this paper were formulated into the fundamental rules of biological clocks.

=== Aschoff's Rule ===
==== History ====
Aschoff's experiments executed in 1960 showed that under constant light conditions, the activity phase shortens in nocturnal organisms and lengthens in diurnal organisms. These trends were termed alpha compression and alpha expansion, respectively. In tribute to his mentor, Pittendrigh called this observation "Aschoff's Rule" in a different 1960 publication, and the designation remains today.

Aschoff's rule is related to the model of parametric entrainment, which assumes continuous phase changes. This means that activity patterns adjust to environmental light patterns. Parametric and non-parametric concepts refer to the nature of the action of light, whether continuous or tonic in the case of parametric entrainment, or discrete or phasic in the case of nonparametric entrainment. Suggestive of phasic effects are the large phase shifts elicited often by very brief light pulses, while the changes in period as a result of different constant light intensities are proof of the existence of tonic effects. Aschoff and Pittendrigh approached the field with different models of how oscillators entrain, which resulted in different predictive models. Aschoff's parametric model states that entrainment occurs through gradual changes in the clock that adapt to a new light-dark cycle. Although this is no longer recognized as the only objectively correct model in the field, Serge Daan suggested in 1998 that Aschoff made qualitative contributions that provide valuable alternatives to inconsistencies in the current field.

==== Terms ====
Relevant terms to understanding Aschoff's Rule are listed below:

- Actogram: A graph of the phases of activity and rest over the course of a day.
- Alpha: The duration of wake time.
- Alpha Compression: The observation that under constant light conditions, the length of activity of nocturnal organisms shortens.
- Alpha Expansion: The observation that under constant darkness conditions, the length of activity of nocturnal organisms lengthens.
- Circadian: Any rhythm that has a period of approximately 24h.
- Circadian Clock: The endogenous, molecular mechanism which regulates circadian rhythms.
- Circadian Time (CT): Time defined by an organism's intrinsic clock without accounting for Zeitgebers.
- Diurnal: An organism that displays activity during the day (in light conditions) and during subjective day (in constant conditions)
- Endogenous: Growing or working from within an organism; intrinsic.
- Entrainment: The process an organism undergoes when synchronizing endogenous rhythms to a Zeitgeber.
- Free-Running Period (FRP): The length of time it takes for an organism's endogenous rhythm to repeat without Zeitgebers in constant conditions (LL or DD).
- Masking: The apparent coupling of an observable rhythm in an organism to a Zeitgeber, but this change is not caused by an alteration of the endogenous clock that schedules the observable rhythm, but by a confounding variable.
- Nocturnal: An organism that is active during the night (in light conditions) and during subjective night (in constant conditions).
- Onset of Activity: The time when the passive phase ends, and the active phase begins.
- Phase-Shift: A change in free-running cycle, caused by an external stimulus.
- Phase Response Curve (PRC): A graph representing the ways that external stimuli can affect phase.
- Photoperiod: (a.k.a. Day Length): The duration of light in an external light-dark cycle.
- Splitting: A phenomenon that occurs in high-intensity, constant light conditions, where two separate bouts of activity can be observed in one period.
- Tau 'τ': The length of an organism's free-running period.
- Tau 'Τ': The total period of an external period, environmental period.
- Zeitgeber: Any external time cue that is effective in entraining an organism.
- Zeitgeber Time (ZT): Time defined by external stimuli.

==== Rules ====
Aschoff's 4 Rules are generalities that most diurnal and nocturnal organisms follow. The main basis for Aschoff's rule was the differential responses in free-running periods to DD and LL, later expanded to Tau=f(LL-intensity). These rules provide an explanation of how the free running period (Tau 'τ') of an organism deviates slightly from a 24-hour period.

Rule 1: The free running period of a nocturnal organism is typically less than 24 hours.𝜏_{DD} < 24.

Rule 2: The free running period of a diurnal organism is typically more than 24 hours.𝜏_{LL} > 24

Rule 3: Increasing the intensity of a light in LL will typically increase the length of a free running period in nocturnal organisms.

Rule 4: Increasing the intensity of a light in LL will typically decrease the length of a free running period in diurnal organisms.

To help with understanding, a nocturnal species such as house mice that are kept in a constantly dark environment would exhibit a free-running period shorter than 24 hours (Aschoff's first rule). In contrast, a diurnal species such as a starling that is kept in a constantly dark environment would exhibit a free-running period longer than 24 hours (Aschoff's second rule).

There are a few exceptions to these rules. For example, certain species of ground beetles and squirrels violate Aschoff's first rule by not producing the predicted changes in their free-running rhythms in response to constant light (LL). Some arthropods also appear to violate Aschoff's third rule however it is not certain because prior lighting history can cause long-lasting after-effects on the circadian period and alter the observed compliance with Aschoff's Rules.

=== Later work ===
Much of Aschoff's later work involved tests on human subjects. He found that the absence of a light-dark cycle does not prevent humans from entrainment. Rather, knowing the time of day from social cues, such as regular meal times, is sufficient for entrainment. Aschoff also found that different circadian outputs such as body temperature and locomotor activity can be either internally synchronized or desynchronized depending on the strength of the Zeitgeber. In constant darkness, rectal temperature and sleep onset and duration became desynchronized in some subjects, and the rectal temperature at the time of sleep onset was correlated to the duration of the bout of sleep. He hypothesized that internal desynchronization, the phase differences resulting from period differences between two circadian output processes, could be related to many psychiatric disorders.

Some of Aschoff's later work also integrated his initial interest in thermoregulation with his work on circadian rhythm. He found a circadian rhythm in thermal conductance, a measurement of heat transfer from the body. Minimal conductance in mammals and birds oscillates with circadian phase, with a wide range of conductance values. This allows animals to release heat during their activity period, when they have higher basal metabolism, as well as conserve heat during their rest period, when they have lower basal metabolism. In birds, the circadian rhythm in conductance results mostly from circadian rates of evaporative heat loss. In mammals, the conductance oscillates with circadian rhythms in the body's heat resistance and blood flow rate.

Following up on his temperature studies, he found that a mammalian species can entrain to a temperature cycle, but that temperature is a weak Zeitgeber compared to a light-dark cycle.

Aschoff described masking signals as inputs that circumvent the pacemaker but nevertheless lead to modulation of a circadian behavior that is also controlled by the pacemaker. Parametric entrainment is entrainment that does not result from an instant change in phase, as governed by a Phase Response Curve, as in the case of masking signals. The term Aschoff used for this phenomenon is "arousal" due to non-photic zeitgebers. Data from experimental assays show a relationship between masking effects and phase, leading to a "demasking" effect whereby animals arrhythmic in constant conditions have free-running periods in high frequency light-dark cycles. Aschoff concluded that the oscillator or circadian clock "integrates" over the intensity of light to which it has been exposed, and then responds with a change in the period of activity, as seen in greenfinches, chaffinches, hamsters, and siskins. Aschoff concluded, however, that non-parametric effects, as opposed to parametric effects, are the principal source of entrainment.

=== Aschoff–Wever Model ===
Jurgen Aschoff and Rütger Wever created an experiment in which participants lived in a bunker for multiple weeks in a row, with limited to no access to the outside world, to measure effects on bodily functioning, sleep-wake activity, and time perception. Participants were asked to press a buzzer every hour and one minute after the hour. The scientists found that urine and rectal samples and circadian rhythms had a free-running period of 25 hours.

==== Light Intensity ====
The impact of light intensity on the circadian period was measured by changing light lux from 40 to 200. Increasing the light intensity can cause a decrease in the period of .7-1hour.

==== Desynchronization ====
Desynchronization of body temperature from circadian period was seen in some participants immediately upon entry to the bunker or after several weeks. Body temperature maintained approximately a 25-hour rhythm while sleep-wake cycles fluctuated significantly. This led to the hypothesis that humans may have multiple circadian clocks.

==== Current Implications ====
Free running periods in humans are thought to range from 23.56hrs-24.7hrs, and it is suspected that the larger value found in this experiment is due to light exposure. The dual circadian pacemaker model has been updated to a system of a central and a peripheral clock.

=== Influence on other researchers ===
Aschoff published articles with both Pittendrigh and Serge Daan, the latter also a pivotal researcher in chronobiology. In his late work, Daan attempted to reconcile the idea of parametric entrainment to light proposed by Aschoff with the non-parametric model of entrainment proposed by Pittendrigh. Results from a 2008 paper from Daan's lab lend further evidence to Aschoff's model of parametric entrainment. Daan died in 2018.

=== Current Research Based on Aschoff's Rules ===
Aschoff's work inspired research related to blue light intensity, molecular basis of circadian rhythms, and modeling the SCN.

At the Chinese Academy of Sciences in Beijing, China in the Wang lab, research was conducted to determine the role of blue light on CRY2 and PRR9 interactions in plants to create a molecular basis for Aschoff's rule. CRY2 is stimulated by blue light to interact directly with PRR9. This prevents PRR9 from interacting with co-repressor TPL/TPRs and downstream kinase PPKs. The co-repressor and downstream kinases phosphorylate PRR9 to help regulate rhythms. In an experiment to determine the relationship between varying light intensity and PRR9 mutants, it was discovered that both PRR9-1 and PRR90x-1 had changes of photoperiods under high light irradiance. This variation is deemed to be related to CRY2 activity. It was also found that CRY2 blocks PRR9-TPL interactions by GFP tagging the photolyase homology region on CRY2. The PHR domain of CRY2 by itself can co-immunoprecipitate full-length PRR9, meaning CRY2 can be used to isolate the protein. Additionally CRY2 is found to inhibit PRR9 phosphorylation using lambda phosphatase treatments. The phosphorylation of PRR9 is critical for circadian rhythms. Blue light stimulates CRY2 activity, thereby altering the phosphorylation of PRR9 and timing of circadian rhythms.

‌In the Foster lab at Imperial College in London, United Kingdom, research was conducted to determine the molecular basis for Aschoff's rule. Wheel running behavior was collected from mice in DD or LL for 50 days and the abundance of four genes and proteins was collected every four hours using in situ hybridization and immunohistochemistry. Researchers found that in DD mPer1, mPer2, mCry1, and mCry2 messages demonstrated rhythmic behavior and their corresponding protein levels also demonstrated rhythmic behavior. In LL mPer1, mPer2, mCry1, and mCry2 demonstrated rhythmic behavior but mCry2 had significantly altered behavior compared to its DD rhythm. Additionally, mPER1, mCRY1, and mCRY2 all showed rhythmic behavior but mPER2 was constitutively expressed. Phase contrast microscopy was used to show that mPER2 was concentrated in the nucleus during LL, as it appears in DD during CT12. Under DD, mice had an average period of 23.26 ± 0.05h. In LL, mice had an average period of 24.47 ± 0.06hrs. The LL mice had a significantly longer period. This research supports the idea that mPER2 contributes to phase delays. Additionally, it suggests that light does not act on mPer2 transcription or mPER2 translation to the nucleus. Rather, light is inhibiting a different mechanism that would typically cause mPER2 degradation.

At the University of Aveiro, Portugal in the Yoon lab researchers determined that the core-shell organization of the suprachiasmatic nuclei (Kuramoto model) contributes to anticipation and dissociation with regard to activity. Previous research states that the SCN shell (ventral) is dense with arginine vasopressin neurons and the core possesses vasoactive intestinal polypeptide neurons. [4] It was determined that the SCN upholds Aschoff's first rule of a shorting free-running period in DD and a lengthening period in LL. The Kuramoto model accounts for free-running periods coming from individual cells while also considering population-based activity coming from neurons as they exhibit nearly identical patterns. In the entrained state, the core activity parallels the external stimulus. However, the shell peaks before the core. This allows the system to demonstrate anticipation of external events by peaking at two separate times and queueing peripheral clocks of the incoming signal. The shell phase difference (ψ_{d-}ψ_{v}) is shown to be proportional to the gap between peak activity between the two.

== Aschoff's Rule (prize) ==
At a dinner held in Aschoff's honor at the 1991 Gordon Conference on Chronobiology, Professor Till Roenneberg began the tradition of giving the "Aschoff's Rule Prize" to scientists who have advanced the field of chronobiology. It was first given to Professor Maroli K. Chandrashekera in 1991. Recipients choose the winner the following year and must follow two guidelines:

- The successor should be a chronobiologist working in a country different from that of the current holder of the prize.
- The successor should be working with an organism different from that of the current holder of the prize.

== Selected publications ==
- Exogenous and Endogenous Components in Circadian Rhythms (1960),
- Beginn und Ende der täglichen Aktivität freilebender Vögel (with R. Wever, 1962),
- Circadian Clocks (1965) *Desynchronization and Resynchronization of Human Circadian Rhythm (1969)
- Aschoff, J. (1965) Circadian Rhythms in Man. Science. 148: 1427–1432.
