= Gustav Kramer =

German zoologist and ornithologist

Gustav Kramer (11 March 1910 – 19 April 1959) was a German zoologist and ornithologist who specialised in allometry. He described Xenopus laevis, the African clawed frog, for the first time in his doctoral thesis. Near the end of the 1940s, he discovered that birds can use the sun as a compass.

== Career ==
In 1933 Kramer did a study on Xenopus laevis in Berlin. At the Kaiser Wilhelm Institute for Medical Research, under Ludolf von Krehl, he worked on the metabolism of warm-blooded animals. After that, he worked as an assistant at German-Italian Institute of Marine Biology in Rovinj, Croatia. In 1941, he relocated to Naples to conduct a study on lizards, especially the Adriatic lizard. He studied the comparative morphological and genetic differences between mainland and island forms to draw conclusions about the lizard's speciation.

In 1948 Kramer headed a department of the Max Planck Institute for Marine Biology in Wilhelmshaven. There he conducted research on how birds are able to orient themselves over long distances. He constructed an apparatus that allowed him to test how animals react to the position of the sun by tricking the animals into thinking the sun was in a different position. With this experiment, he demonstrated that the direction of flight is dependent on the position of the sun in the sky. Because this ability requires an inner clock to measure the time of day, Kramer sought cooperation with Jürgen Aschoff. From 1 April 1958, Kramer worked with the emerging Aschoff Max Planck near Tübingen. He coined the word Zugunruhe, meaning migratory restlessness.

== Death ==
On 19 April 1959, while trying to remove young rock pigeons from their nests in the mountains of Calabria, he fell and was killed instantly. His two sons secured his body from the high-running mountain river Raganello.

The obituary written by Konrad Lorenz in the Journal of Ornithology stated: "his authorized worldwide fame as the initiator of experimental analytical orientation research" should not be forgotten.

== Publications ==
- Untersuchungen über die Sinnesleistungen und das Orientierungsverhalten von Xenopus laevis Daud. Zool. Jahrb., Bd. 52, S. 629–676, Jena: Fischer 1933; zugl. Berlin, Phil. Diss.
- Experiments on bird orientation. Ibis 94: 265-285 (1952)
