= Circannual cycle =

Biological process

In chronobiology, the circannual cycle is characterized by biological processes and behaviors recurring on an approximate annual basis, spanning a period of about one year. This term is particularly relevant in the analysis of seasonal environmental changes and their influence on the physiology, behavior, and life cycles of organisms. Adaptations observed in response to these circannual rhythms include fur color transformation, molting, migration, breeding, fattening and hibernation, all of which are inherently driven and synchronized with external environmental changes.

The regulation of these cycles is linked to internal biological clocks, akin to the circadian rhythm, which respond to external cues such as variations in temperature, daylight length (photoperiod), and food availability. Such environmental signals enable organisms to anticipate seasonal variations and adjust their behaviors and physiological states, thereby optimizing evolutionary fitness and reproductive success.

Circannual rhythms are evident in a range of organisms, including birds, mammals, fish, and insects, facilitating their adaptation to the cyclical nature of their habitats. Circannual cycles can be defined by three primary characteristics: persistence in the absence of apparent time cues, the capacity for phase shifting, and stability against temperature fluctuations. Classified as an infradian rhythm, it occurs less frequently than a circadian rhythm. This cycle was first discovered by Ebo Gwinner and Canadian biologist Ted Pengelley.

Derived from Latin, the term circannual combines circa, meaning approximately, with annual, referring to a period of one year.

== Examples ==
In one study performed by Eberhard Gwinner, two species of birds were born in a controlled environment without ever being exposed to external stimuli. They were presented with a fixed Photoperiod of 10 hours of light and 14 hours of darkness each day. The birds were exposed to these conditions for eight years and consistently molted at the same time as they would have in the wild, indicating that this physiological cycle is innate rather than governed environmentally.

Researchers Ted Pengelley and Ken Fisher studied the circannual clock in the golden-mantled ground squirrel. They exposed the squirrels to twelve hours of light and 12 hours of darkness and at a constant temperature for three years. Despite this constant cycle, they continued to hibernate once a year with each episode preceded by an increase in body weight and food consumption. During the first year, the squirrels began hibernation in late October. They started hibernating in mid August and early April respectively for the following two years, displaying a circannual rhythm with a period of about 10 months.

An annual rhythm has been observed in humans diagnosed with obsessive compulsive tic disorder (OCTD). The study focused on observing the patients’ seasonal patterns and how the cycle of seasons affected their behaviors. They observed that there was a statistically significant annual rhythm in patients with OC symptoms but not in patients with tic symptoms. As a result of the study, the researchers concluded that treatments for this disorder can be implemented following an observation of the patient’s cycle and annual rhythm that they follow.

Gwinner observed the willow warbler (Phylloscopus trochilus) which is a bird species that migrates seasonally to tropical and southern Africa. They follow an annual cycle of migration starting in September and ending in mid-November for the winter and then migrate back between March and May. The willow warblers follow this cycle to maximize reproduction in the spring/summer as well as increasing available resources in the fall/winter. Gwinner observed that even through a lack of environmental cues for migration, the willow warblers followed precise schedules attributed to their circannual rhythm. The willow warblers would consistently molt between January and February, they would have gonadal growth initiate in the winter and continue on their migration back for the spring, and they would begin a fattening process precisely at the same time year after year for their spring migrations.

A classic example in insects is the varied carpet beetle. In a study performed by T. Nisimura and H. Numata in 2003, the seasonal timing and synchrony of pupation in the Varied Carpet Beetle (Anthrenus verbasci) was determined by studying how natural patterns in photoperiod and temperature affected it. The authors first fostered larvae under various constant photoperiods at a constant temperature of 20°C to determine if there was a critical duration of the photophase that affected the phase of circannual rhythm. Secondly, they examined if a decrease in temperature caused a phase-shift in the circannual rhythm. Third, they fostered larvae under a natural photoperiod at a constant temperature of 20°C and compared it to a group under natural photoperiod and temperature. Lastly, to clarify the significance of the circannual control of the A. verbasci life cycle, larvae were reared under natural photoperiod and temperature from the various times of the year. The results showed that the critical day-length was between 13 and 14 hours of light, that a decrease in temperature of 5°C did not affect the phase-shift, that larvae under controlled light but fluctuating temperatures experienced a delay in pupation compared to natural light and natural temperatures and that spring in Japan was the best time of the year for synchronous pupation which slowed as spring turned to summer.

Circannual and circadian rhythms can be influenced by metabolism which is primarily influenced from natural external environmental factors such as daily weather and seasons. Location adaptations are needed to survive in extreme environmental changes. These rhythms are influenced by variable environmental cues, and in some species are influenced by internal cues. In a study conducted by Catalina Reyes, the authors took a further look into how red-eared sliders showed circadian and circannual rhythms in metabolism, and if metabolic rates overall influenced the circadian and circannual cues. These rhythms were studied over one year, and displayed evidence of endogenous circadian and circannual rhythms in metabolism. The understanding was that in order for these rhythms to be expressed, environmental cues influenced these thermo and phyto cycles eliciting circadian and circannual rhythms of the red-eared sliders. The sensitivity to these environmental influences reflect adaptations to migration patterns that could serve as further insight to the cost-and-benefit of transportation and risk of predation.

Environmental external factors are the key drivers into influencing circannual and circadian rhythms. Although they may all differ depending on species, they all are influenced by factors like weather and seasonality. At temperate latitudes, circannual rhythms align with the day lengths, and in mammals, the hormone melatonin is reactive to the proportional length of evenings. Authors that collaborated on this study focused on the circannual alignment of, (Rangifer tarandus tarandus), better known as arctic reindeer. They are known to limit production of a rhythmic melatonin signal when exposed to prolonged periods of midwinter darkness and midsummer light. Areas in temperate regions are known to have prolonged periods of light and darkness, for instance, like in Alaska. They concluded that rhythmical melatonin secretion is a psychological response to the orientation of the sun in early winter months and the delay of circannual programme during the following autumnal months.

== Biological advantages ==
Generating biological rhythms internally helps organisms anticipate important changes in the environment before they occur, thus providing the organisms with time to prepare and survive. For example, some plants have a very strict time frame in regards to blooming and preparing for spring. If they begin their preparations too early or too late they risk not being pollinated, competing with different species, or other factors that might affect their survival rate. Having a circannual cycle may keep them from making this mistake if a particular geographic region experiences a false spring, where the weather becomes exceptionally warm early for a short period of time before returning to winter temperatures.

Similarly, bird plumage and mammal fur change with the approach of winter, and is triggered by the shortening photoperiod of autumn. The circannual cycle can also be useful for animals that Migrate or Hibernate. Many animals' reproductive organs change in response to changes in photoperiod. Male gonads will grow during the onset of spring to promote reproduction among the species. These enlarged gonads would be nearly impossible to keep year round and would be inefficient for the species. Many female animals will only produce eggs during certain times of the year.

== Interaction with changing climate ==
Changing climate may unravel ecosystems in which different organisms use different internal calendars. Warming temperatures may lead to earlier blooms of flora in spring. For instance, one study performed by Menzel et al., analyzed 125,000 phenological records of 542 plant species in 21 European countries from 1971 to 2000 and found that 78% of all plants studied advanced in flowering, leafing, and fruiting while only three percent were significantly delayed. They determined that the average advance of spring and summer was 2.5 days per decade in Europe. Meanwhile, fauna may breed or migrate based on the length of day, and thus might arrive too late for critical food supplies they co-evolved with.

For example, the Parus major closely times the hatching of their chicks to the emergence of the protein-rich winter moth caterpillar, which in turn hatches to meet the budding of oaks. These birds are a single-brood bird, meaning they breed once a year with about nine chicks per brood. If the birds and caterpillars and buds all emerge at the right time, the caterpillars eat the new oak leaves and their population increases dramatically, and this hopefully will coincide with the arrival of the new chicks, allowing them to eat. But if plants, insects, and birds respond differently to the advance of spring or other phenology changes, the relationship may be altered.

As another example, studies of the Pied Flycatcher (ficedula hypoleuca) have shown that their spring migration timing is triggered by an internal circannual clock that is fine tuned to day length. These particular birds overwinter in dry tropical forest in Western Africa and breed in temperate forests in Europe, over 4,500 km away. From 1980-2000, temperatures at the time of arrival and the start of breeding have warmed significantly. They have advanced their mean laying date by ten days, but have not advanced the spring arrival on their breeding grounds because their migration behavior is triggered by photoperiod rather than temperature.

In short, even if each individual species can easily live with elevated temperatures, disruptions of phenology timing at ecosystem level may still imperil them.

== Challenges for scientific study ==
One reason for the paucity of research on circannual cycles is the duration of required efforts. The ratio of the period length of a circannual cycle to the length of the productive life of a scientist makes this branch of chronobiology difficult. It takes an entire year to get a time series which makes it difficult to see how these cycles adjust over the years. To put this into perspective, a two-week experiment for a circadian biologist would take fourteen years for a circannual researcher, in order to achieve the same level of data robustness for the conclusions.

== Related Topics ==
Circadian rhythms - If circadian rhythm enables animals to prepare physiologically and behaviorally for certain predictable daily changes in the environment, might not some animals possess a circannual rhythm that runs on an approximately 365 cycle? A circannual clock mechanism could be similar to the circadian master clock, with an environment-independent timer capable of generating a circannual rhythm in conjunction with a mechanism that keeps the clock entertained to local conditions.

Nocturnality is when animals are active during the night, and inactive during the day. This adaptation allows for animals to avoid predators that may not have this adaptability, as well as having availability to resources that are otherwise not harvested by non-nocturnal animals. Some animals that are nocturnal have disadvantages in animal sensory systems, such as bats, they have poor vision and use other adaptations such as echolocation, something a non-nocturnal animal would not have.

Photoperiodism is the ability of plants and animals to use the length of day or night, resulting in the modification of their activities. A response from an organism to the length in daylight and time that allows for adaptations to seasonal variations and environmental changes. It orchestrates seasonal growth, development, reproduction, migration, and dormancy that affect survivorship and reproductive success. Changes in photoperiod over days and seasons created the opportunity for the development of internal clocks and eventually create circadian and circannual rhythms. Photoperiod can affect the circannual rhythms of animals if changed significantly.
