= Josephine Arendt =

Endocrinologist and chronobiologist

- Born: Josephine Wragg; 1941; Newark-on-Trent
- Died: 2023 (aged 81–82)
- Education: University College London; University of London; Collège de France
- Scientific career
- Workplaces: Queen Charlotte's and Chelsea Hospital; University of Surrey; University of Geneva

Josephine Arendt (née Wragg) (1941–2023) was a British biologist who served as Professor of Chronobiology at the University of Surrey. She established the Centre for Chronobiology at the University of Surrey. Her research considered circadian rhythms, melatonin and sleep. She was elected Fellow of the Royal College of Pathologists and the Royal Society of Medicine.

== Early life and education ==
Arendt was born in Newark-on-Trent. Her father was a prisoner of war in Austria, and the family moved to Guernsey when he returned. Arendt grew up in Jerbourg and Moulin Huet, where her father became a headmaster. She spent her summer holidays at the Collège de France, where she specialised in marine biology. She moved to University College London to study biochemistry for her undergraduate studies. Her doctoral research considered the metabolism of 5-hydroxyindole. After graduating, Arendt moved to Queen Charlotte's and Chelsea Hospital and eventually to Geneva, where she worked on Xenopus laevis. After twelve years in Geneva she returned to the United Kingdom, where she became a researcher at the University of Surrey.

== Research and career ==
Arendt was eventually made Professor of Endocrinology at the University of Surrey, where she pioneered the field of chronobiology. She developed immunotechnology to characterise and understand the role of melatonin and its metabolites in sleep and the circadian rhythm. She studied how they respond to light and their responses in conditions such as shift work, polar nights and jet lag. She was one of the first to scientifically describe jet lag, and the first to develop therapeutic use of melatonin to alleviate its imapcts.

Arendt created a situation where volunteers were kept in darkened rooms without clocks, light or social cues. Under typical circumstances bodies follow a circadian rhythm, which can be extended from 23 to 25 hours when deprived of context. Her observations helped to explain why humans can accommodate an extra hour of sleep as opposed to losing it. Over the course of a 23-hour sleep cycle, hormones are secreted at the wrong times, causing a person to feel awake and hungry at inappropriate times. Disruptions to circadian rhythms in people who work night shifts or as flight attendants can cause carcinogenic effects.

== Awards and honours ==
- Fellow of the Royal College of Pathologists
- Fellow of the Royal Society of Medicine
- Karolinska Institute Medal of St Goran's Hospital
- Medal of Justus von Liebig University
- Ernst and Berta Scharrer Medal
- European Biological Rhythms Society Johannes Ariens Kappers Meda
- Medical University of Łódź Doctor Honoris Causa

== Selected publications ==
- J. Arendt (1 August 2005). "Melatonin: Characteristics, Concerns, and Prospects". Journal of Biological Rhythms. 20 (4): 291–303. doi:10.1177/0748730405277492. ISSN 0748-7304. PMID 16077149. Wikidata Q22299303.
- Josephine Arendt (1 January 2010). "Shift work: coping with the biological clock". Occupational Medicine. 60 (1): 10–20. doi:10.1093/occmed/kqp162. ISSN 0962-7480. PMID 20051441. Wikidata Q37668860.
- K Thapan; J Arendt; D J Skene (15 August 2001). "An action spectrum for melatonin suppression: evidence for a novel non-rod, non-cone photoreceptor system in humans". The Journal of Physiology. 535 (Pt 1): 261–7. doi:10.1111/j.1469-7793.2001.t01-1-00261.x. ISSN 0022-3751. PMC 2278766. PMID 11507175. Wikidata Q28346116.
