= Infradian rhythm =

Biological rhythm longer than 24 hours

In chronobiology, an infradian rhythm is a health rhythm with a period longer than the period of a circadian rhythm, i.e., one cycle is longer than 24 hours. Some examples of infradian rhythms in mammals include menstruation, breeding, migration, hibernation, molting and fur or hair growth, and tidal or seasonal rhythms. In contrast, ultradian rhythms have periods shorter (<24 hours) than the period of a circadian rhythm.

Several infradian rhythms are known to be caused by hormone or neurotransmitter stimulation or by environmental factors such as the lunar cycles. For example, seasonal depression, an example of an infradian rhythm occurring once a year, can be caused by the systematic lowering of light levels during the winter. The seasonal affective disorder can be classified as infradian, or as circannual, which means occurring on a yearly basis.

== Observed patterns ==
The most well-known infradian rhythm in humans is the fluctuation of estrogens and progesterone across the menstrual cycle. Another example in humans is the ~10-day rhythms of enamel growth. Other infradian rhythms have been documented in organisms such as dormice, lemmings, voles, lynx, mice, etc.

Other writers more narrowly define infradian rhythms as rhythms longer than 24 hour but shorter than one year; categorizing rhythms of about a year as circannual rhythms (circannual cycle).

Some studies observe an infradian rhythm with a period of approximately 7 days (circaseptan rhythm). However, these rhythms appear to be an artifact of the statistics applied to the raw data.

== See also ==
- Photoperiodicity
