= Ultradian rhythm =

Recurrent period shorter than 24 hours, in chronobiology

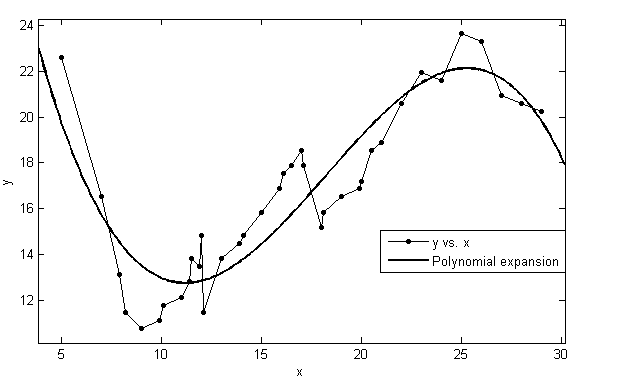
Leptin circadian cycle, interfered by three meals. One can see that leptin goes high during the day, then it falls off, before starting the cycle again. The line is a fitted curve to the experimental data, using polynomial expansion, in order to show the periodic behavior of the data.

In chronobiology, an ultradian rhythm is a recurrent period or cycle repeated throughout a 24-hour day. In contrast, circadian rhythms complete one cycle daily, while infradian rhythms such as the menstrual cycle have periods longer than a day. The Oxford English Dictionary's definition of ultradian specifies that it refers to cycles with a period shorter than a day but longer than an hour.

The descriptive term ultradian is used in sleep research in reference to the 90–120 minute cycling of the sleep stages during human sleep.

There is a circasemidian rhythm in body temperature and cognitive function which is technically ultradian. However, this appears to be the first harmonic of the circadian rhythm of each and not an endogenous rhythm with its own rhythm generator.

Other ultradian rhythms include blood circulation, blinking, pulse, hormonal secretions such as growth hormone, heart rate, thermoregulation, micturition, bowel activity, nostril dilation, appetite, and arousal. Ultradian rhythms of appetite require antiphasic release of neuropeptide Y (NPY) and corticotropin-releasing hormone (CRH), stimulating and inhibiting appetite ultradian rhythms. Recently, ultradian rhythms of arousal lasting approximately 4 hours were attributed to the dopaminergic system in mammals. When the dopaminergic system is perturbed either by use of drugs or by genetic disruption, these 4-hour rhythms can lengthen significantly into the infradian (> 24 h) range, sometimes even lasting for days (> 110 h) when methamphetamine are provided.

According to a study published in 1996: Ultradian mood states in bipolar disorder cycle much faster than rapid cycling; the latter is defined as four or more mood episodes in one year, sometimes occurring within a few weeks. Ultradian mood cycling is characterized by cycles shorter than 24 hours.

== See also ==
- Circadian rhythm
