= Colin Pittendrigh =

English biologist (1918–1996)

Colin S. Pittendrigh
- Born: 13 October 1918; Whitley Bay, Northumberland, England
- Died: 19 March 1996 (aged 77); Bozeman, Montana, U.S.
- Education: University of Durham; Columbia University
- Known for: Circadian rhythms
- Scientific career
- Fields: Chronobiology, Biology

Dean of Princeton University Graduate School
- In office 1965–1969
- Preceded by: Donald Ross Hamilton
- Succeeded by: Aaron Lemonick

Colin Stephenson Pittendrigh (October 13, 1918 – March 19, 1996) was a British-born biologist who spent most of his adult life in the United States. Pittendrigh is regarded as the "father of the biological clock," and founded the modern field of chronobiology alongside Jürgen Aschoff and Erwin Bünning. He is known for his careful descriptions of the properties of the circadian clock in Drosophila and other species, and providing the first formal models of how circadian rhythms entrain (synchronize) to local light-dark cycles.

== Life ==
=== Early life ===
Colin Pittendrigh was born in Whitley Bay, on the coast of Northumberland (today Tyne and Wear) on October 13, 1918. He received his first degree in botany in 1940 from University of Durham, now University of Newcastle upon Tyne.

=== Enlistment ===
Pittendrigh was a conscientious objector and so during World War II, he was assigned to wartime service to try and improve the production of bananas and other fruit that was being shipped to the UK during the war. He also worked as a biologist for the Rockefeller Foundation and the government of Trinidad to control malaria near the military bases there. He studied the epidemiology of malaria transmitted by mosquitoes breeding in epiphytic bromeliad ("tanks" formed by overlapping leaves) in the forest canopy. He made acute observations on bromeliad distribution within forest canopies and between contrasting forest formations. He observed daily rhythms in mosquito activity patterns, particularly noting that peak activity times were different for different species at different canopy levels. His work with the biting rhythms of these mosquitoes was responsible for the development of his interest in biological rhythms, which later led to his experimental studies on eclosion rhythm in Drosophila.

=== Marriage and children ===
Pittendrigh married Margaret "Mikey" Dorothy Eitelbach during the war. Soon after, they moved to Trinidad and lived in the rain forest, where Pittendrigh worked on malaria control as part of the war effort. He returned to the United States in 1945. Margaret and Colin had two children, Robin Rourk, who currently lives in Louisville, Colorado and Colin Jr., who lives in Bozeman. Pittendrigh had a grandson and a granddaughter. Pittendrigh was an avid fly fisherman and outdoorsman, and he and his wife retired to Bozeman, Montana because of their love of the Rocky Mountains.

=== Academic career ===
After the war, Pittendrigh attended Columbia University to study for his Ph.D. in biology under the evolutionary geneticist Theodosius Dobzhansky. When he finished at Columbia in 1947, he joined the faculty at Princeton, as an assistant professor of biology where he began his work concerning circadian rhythms. While at Princeton, he gained his U.S. citizenship in 1950 and served as dean of graduate studies from 1965 to 1969. Pittendrigh also served on a variety of national scientific boards including the Science Advisory Committee to the Administrator of the National Aeronautics and Space Administration (NASA).

In 1969 Pittendrigh left Princeton to join the faculty of Stanford where he helped found the program in Human Biology and later became the director of the Hopkins Marine Station. While serving as the director of the Hopkins Marine Station in 1976-1984, Pittendrigh is credited with helping to rebuild Stanford's century-old marine biology laboratory, bringing in modern molecular biology, ecology and biomechanics, and turning the station into an internationally famous and vigorous one."

Pittendrigh retired from Stanford in 1984 and moved to Bozeman, Montana. Here, he continued his studies of biological clocks, working with the faculty and lecturing at Montana State University – Bozeman.

=== Friendship with Jürgen Aschoff ===
Pittendrigh met Jürgen Aschoff in 1958 when Aschoff made his first visit to the United States. Pittendrigh studied the eclosion rate of fruit flies, while Aschoff studied the continuous circadian rhythm of birds, mammals, and humans. They reached two different conclusions of the entrainment model with Aschoff supporting a parametric entrainment concept (gradual entrainment throughout the day) and Pittendrigh supported a nonparametric entrainment concept (entrainment is sudden and once a day). Despite opposing views, Aschoff and Pittendrigh remained close friends, and they had a lifelong intense exchange of notes and ideas.Their research was described by Serge Daan as "always in harmony, never in synchrony."

== Scientific career ==
=== Research on malaria and the mosquito population in Trinidad (1939 - 1945) ===
During WWII, Pittendrigh was sent to Trinidad to help breed vegetables for the North African campaign and devise methods to help control malaria plaguing troops there. Here, he made important discoveries about the breeding habits of mosquitoes and their need for bromeliad water reservoirs to breed. Pittendrigh found an ingenious solution to controlling the mosquito population. Since they bred in the water tanks collecting on these plants, eliminating the tanks destroyed the mosquito population. Spraying a copper sulfate (CuSO_{4}) solution (non-toxic to humans) on the bromeliads killed them and destroyed the mosquitoes' breeding environment. In addition to his malaria research, Pittendrigh's studies of the daily activity rhythms of mosquitoes sparked his interest in biological clocks, a subject which he came to wholly pursue later at Princeton.

=== Early research on drosophila and entrainment modeling (1947-1967) ===
Pittendrigh was influential in establishing many of the key criteria that a biological system must have in order to be considered a biological clock. His work studying the eclosion (the process of an insect emerging from its pupa stage) rhythms of Drosophila pseudoobscura demonstrated that 1) eclosion rhythms persist without environmental cues (i.e. in constant conditions), 2) unlike most chemical reactions, the period of eclosion remains relatively constant when exposed to changes in ambient temperature ("temperature compensation"), and 3) eclosion rhythms can be entrained by light cycles that are close to the flies' natural period (τ).

Beginning in 1958, Pittendrigh developed the concept of the phase response curve or PRC. The PRC allowed chronobiologists to predict how a biological system would be affected by a change in its light schedule. The PRCs, detected almost simultaneously in Pittendrigh's and Woody Hastings' labs, served as the basis for the nonparametric entrainment model that was soon after proposed by Pittendrigh. This nonparametric model of entrainment predicted that the difference between an environmental period (T) and an organism's intrinsic period (τ) is instantaneously corrected every day when light falls at a particular phase (φ) of the cycle where a phase shift (Δφ) equal to this difference is generated. This is reflected through the expression: Δφ(φ)= τ - T.

While the PRC has been invaluable towards understanding entrainment, there are several notable problems with the model. The PRC, while accurate at describing Drosophila eclosion rhythms, has trouble predicting various aspects of mammalian entrainment. Compressing subjective day or night intervals in mammals leads to changes in activity that are not predicted by the PRC. It was later shown that these differences are partially due to τ and the PRC being malleable entities modifiable through entrainment. Pittendrigh himself recognized that his model of entrainment was based on simplification and could not accurately model all cases of entrainment. However, this model has been salient in furthering our understanding of entrainment and is widely used today to teach the concept of nonparametric entrainment.

Pittendrigh's close friend, Aschoff, proposed a contrasting parametric model of entrainment in which he proposed that light either lengthened or shortened the endogenous period (τ) while also changing the baseline of oscillation. This parametric model suggested that light may affect the period of circadian oscillation and modify the shape – or waveform – and the level around which the oscillation moved. While Aschoff's continuous model of entrainment has largely fallen to the wayside, it is important to remember that Aschoff's contributions helped to address and explain shortcomings in Pittendrigh's nonparametric entrainment model, which is now widely taught and accepted.

=== Work with NASA ===
In 1964-65, Pittendrigh co-chaired the National Academy committee on Mars exploration with Joshua Lederberg, to investigate whether life exists on Mars. The project was conducted at Stanford University and Rockefeller Institute, New York, beginning in the summer of 1964 and concluding in October, 1965. During the same period, he received a NASA exobiology grant for his research on "Circadian rhythms on a biosatellite and on Earth", which studied how being in orbit can affect circadian rhythms (though it's not clear what organisms he studied on, and no later publications could be found on this study). Pittendrigh was also involved in the anti-contamination panel in the international Committee on Space Research (COSPAR), which deals with the risk of contaminating Mars with life from earth and thus destroying man's opportunity to learn whether life developed spontaneously on Mars. In 1966, Pittendrigh co-authored Biology and the Exploration of Mars: Report of a Study, which describes the findings in the exobiology study of 1964-65.

=== Research on nocturnal rodents' circadian pacemaker (1973) ===
Pittendrigh and Daan published a set of five papers reporting their findings on the properties of nocturnal rodents' circadian pacemakers. Below are some major findings:

One-pulse system Instead of shining light on rodents for a long continuous period (e.g. 12hr) to represent "daytime", Pittendrigh showed that a 15 minutes light pulse shone during the subjective night is enough to cause phase shift in animals. This supports the non-parametric property of the circadian clock.

Interspecies and intraspecies differences in responses to light pulses (i.e. difference in PRC) Regardless of whether they belong to the same species or not, rodents with longer period (τ) have larger advance zone in their PRC, because they need to have phase delays more often in order to entrain to local time (24hr). The opposite is true for rodents with shorter period (τ). Its implication on real life is that most diurnal organisms, including humans, have periods longer than 24 hours; they therefore tend to have a larger advance zone in their PRC. Nocturnal animals, on the other hand, often have periods shorter than 24hr; they thus have a larger delay zone.

Two-pulse system (or skeleton photoperiod) To test the effect of Photoperiodism (i.e. varying the length of daytime), Pittendrigh and Daan invented the two-pulse system, with one flash at dawn, and another flash at dusk, and changing the interval between the 2 light pulses to mimic changing photoperiods. When photoperiod (i.e. daytime) gets longer than 12hr, a Phase Jump (also called ψ Jump, where ψ is the phase angle of entrainment) occurs, where the original nocturnal activity jumps to the now longer daytime, and ψ changes abruptly since the clock now treats the second light pulse as light onset and the start of the day. Nonetheless, in nature where photoperiod is complete (i.e. light is constantly shone throughout the daytime), ψ jump is not observed. This supports Aschoff's model of the parametric effect of light.

Dual oscillator model Under constant light and high light intensity, Pittendrigh observed the locomotor activity of hamsters split into two parts, each has its own period. He thus proposed the E & M (Evening and Morning) dual oscillator model. Normally the two oscillator are coupled to each other and generate the intermediate free-running period which is what we usually measure. However, under constant high light intensity, the two oscillator uncouple, and each free runs with its own period, until they are stabilized at 180° apart or recouple again. Their influence on each other is greater when their peaks of activity are closer together. The model quantitatively accommodates τ and α summarized in Aschoff's Rules, and Aftereffects on free-running period are predicted from prior light-dark history.

As the technology of molecular biology advances, researchers found plenty molecular evidence for the E&M dual oscillator model. For example, the experiments of PDF (pigment dispersing factor)-producing cells in drosophila show that PDF is sufficient in generating morning activity, while having no effects on evening peak. In mammals, while normal hamster show SCNs (Suprachiasmatic nucleus) (the main circadian pacemaker in mammals) on 2 sides being in-phase with each other, the split hamster show SCN being anti-phase with each other. Ongoing research is trying to characterize the evening oscillator and study the interactions between E&M oscillators.

=== Later research (1989) ===
The later part of Pittendrigh's research is devoted to studying the temperature dependence of photoperiodic responses in drosophila. This work was crucial in developing the Photo-Periodic Response Curve (PPRC), a phase-response-curve that factors in seasonal daylength changes when describing entrainment. He proposed another dual oscillator model, in which the master oscillator is light sensitive, and the slave oscillator is temperature sensitive. This model explains his observations of seeing significant entrainment responses to varying photostimulation and seeing dampened, yet still significant, responses to changing temperatures. Pittendrigh also collaborated with Knopka on the study of drosophila per mutants (which genetically have longer or shorter intrinsic periods due to mutation in the per gene) and their different entrainment responses to temperature and light stimuli. The per mutants have impaired temperature dependence, which suggests that the activity of the temperature oscillator in the mutants are reduced as compared to wildtype. This is another evidence that support the temperature-light dual model system.

== Timeline of accomplishments ==
- 1940: Graduation from University of Durham in England
- 1940-1945: Stationed in Trinidad working on Malaria for the Rockefeller Foundation
- 1948: Doctoral thesis at Columbia University
- 1947: Assistant Professor of Biology at Princeton University
- 1950: Became U.S. citizen
- 1960: Chaired organizing committee for Cold Spring Harbor Symposium on biological clocks
- 1969: Began his work at Stanford University
- 1976-1984: Director of the Hopkins Marine Station

== Positions and honors ==
- Member of Senior Staff of NASA
- National Academy of Sciences study: "Biology and the Exploration of Mars"
- Fellow of National Academy of Sciences
- Fellow of American Academy of Arts and Sciences
- Member of the American Philosophical Society
- Guggenheim Fellowship
- Alexander von Humboldt Prize
- Gold Medal of the Czech Academy of Sciences
- Director of the Hopkins Marine Station(1976-1984)
- President of the American Society of Naturalists
- Vice-President of the American Association for the Advancement of Science
- Honorary Doctorate, University of Newcastle upon Tyne, 1986.
