= Chronobiology =

Study of rhythms in biological processes of living organisms

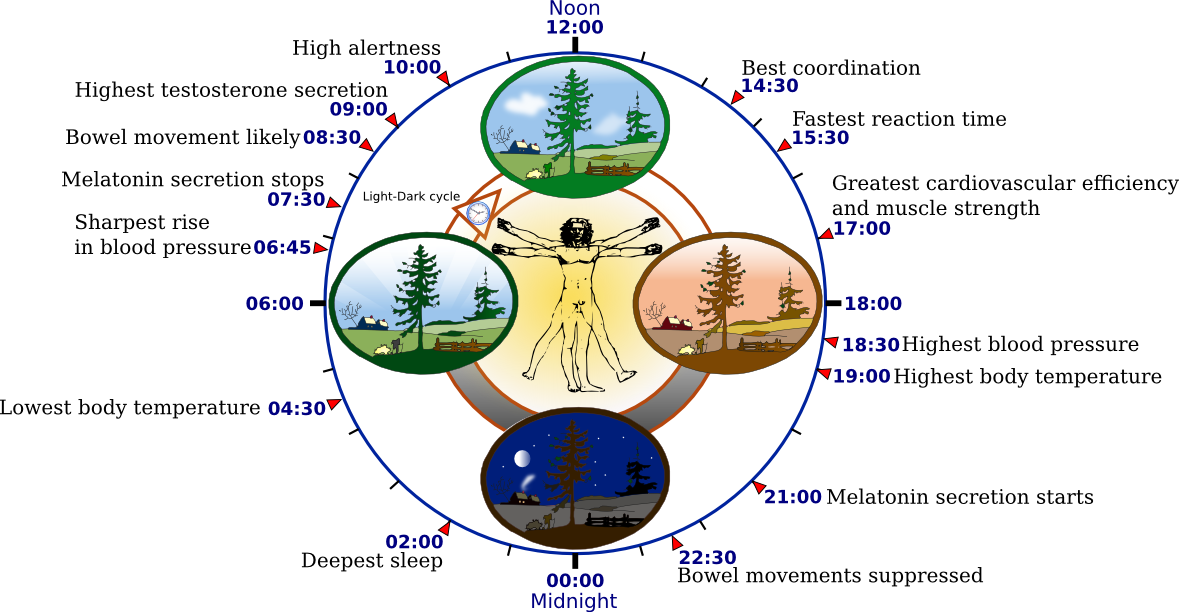
Overview, including some physiological parameters, of the human circadian rhythm ("biological clock")

Chronobiology is a field of biology that examines timing processes, including periodic (cyclic) phenomena in living organisms, such as their adaptation to solar- and lunar-related rhythms. These cycles are known as biological rhythms. Chronobiology comes from the ancient Greek χρόνος (chrónos, meaning "time"), and biology, which pertains to the study, or science, of life. The related terms chronomics and chronome have been used in some cases to describe either the molecular mechanisms involved in chronobiological phenomena or the more quantitative aspects of chronobiology, particularly where comparison of cycles between organisms is required.

Chronobiological studies include but are not limited to comparative anatomy, physiology, genetics, molecular biology and behavior of organisms related to their biological rhythms. Other aspects include epigenetics, development, reproduction, ecology and evolution.

== Subject ==
Chronobiology studies variations of the timing and duration of biological activity in living organisms which occur for many essential biological processes. These occur in animals (eating, sleeping, mating, hibernating, migration, cellular regeneration, etc.), in plants (leaf movements, photosynthetic reactions, etc.), as well as in microbial organisms such as fungi and protozoa. They have also been found in bacteria, especially among the cyanobacteria (blue-green algae). The best studied rhythm in chronobiology is the circadian rhythm, a roughly 24-hour cycle shown by physiological processes in all these organisms. The term circadian comes from the Latin circa, meaning "around" and dies, "day", meaning "approximately a day." The circadian rhythm is regulated by circadian clocks, which are biochemical mechanisms that regulate physiological processes based on time of day.

The circadian rhythm regulates behaviour including timing of the activity phase. Depending on their innate active phase, organisms can be classified into one of three categories:

- Diurnal, which describes organisms active during daytime
- Nocturnal, which describes organisms active in the night
- Crepuscular, which describes animals primarily active during the dawn and dusk hours (ex: domestic cats, white-tailed deer, some bats)

While circadian rhythms are generated by endogenous processes, they can be regulated by both endogenous and exogenous signals. Other biological cycles may be regulated by exogenous signals, such as lunar rhythms in marine life being dictated by the lunar cycle.

Many other important cycles are also studied, including:

- Infradian rhythms, which are cycles longer than a day. Examples include circannual or annual cycles that govern migration or reproduction cycles in many plants and animals, or the human menstrual cycle.
- Ultradian rhythms, which are cycles shorter than 24 hours, such as the 90-minute REM cycle, the 4-hour nasal cycle, or the 3-hour cycle of growth hormone production.
- Tidal rhythms, commonly observed in marine life, which follow the roughly 12.4-hour transition from high to low tide and back.
- Lunar rhythms, which follow the lunar month (29.5 days). They are relevant e.g. for marine life, as the level of the tides is modulated across the lunar cycle.

Within each cycle, the time period during which the process is more active is called the acrophase. When the process is less active, the cycle is in its bathyphase or trough phase. The particular moment of highest activity is the peak or maximum; the lowest point is the nadir.

== History ==
A circadian cycle was first observed in the 18th century in the movement of plant leaves by the French scientist Jean-Jacques d'Ortous de Mairan. In 1751, Swedish botanist and naturalist Carl Linnaeus (Carl von Linné) designed a flower clock using certain species of flowering plants. By arranging the selected species in a circular pattern, he designed a clock that indicated the time of day by the flowers that were open at each given hour. For example, among members of the daisy family, he used the hawk's beard plant which opened its flowers at 6:30 am and the hawkbit which did not open its flowers until 7 am.

The 1960 symposium at Cold Spring Harbor Laboratory laid the groundwork for the field of chronobiology.

It was also in 1960 that Patricia DeCoursey invented the phase response curve while studying light response in rodents, one of the major tools used in the field since.

Franz Halberg of the University of Minnesota, who coined the word circadian, is widely considered the "father of American chronobiology." However, it was Colin Pittendrigh and not Halberg who was elected to lead the Society for Research in Biological Rhythms in the 1970s. Halberg wanted more emphasis on the human and medical issues while Pittendrigh had his background more in evolution and ecology. With Pittendrigh as leader, the Society members did basic research on all types of organisms, plants as well as animals. More recently it has been difficult to get funding for such research on any other organisms than mice, rats, humans and fruit flies.

== The role of Retinal Ganglion cells ==
=== Melanopsin as a circadian photopigment ===
In 2002, Hattar and his colleagues showed that melanopsin plays a key role in a variety of photic responses, including pupillary light reflex, and synchronization of the biological clock to daily light-dark cycles. He also described the role of melanopsin in ipRGCs. Using a rat melanopsin gene, a melanopsin-specific antibody, and fluorescent immunocytochemistry, the team concluded that melanopsin is expressed in some RGCs. Using a Beta-galactosidase assay, they found that these RGC axons exit the eyes together with the optic nerve and project to the suprachiasmatic nucleus (SCN), the primary circadian pacemaker in mammals. They also demonstrated that the RGCs containing melanopsin were intrinsically photosensitive. Hattar concluded that melanopsin is the photopigment in a small subset of RGCs that contributes to the intrinsic photosensitivity of these cells and is involved in their non-image forming functions, such as photic entrainment and pupillary light reflex.

=== Melanopsin cells relay inputs from rods and cones ===
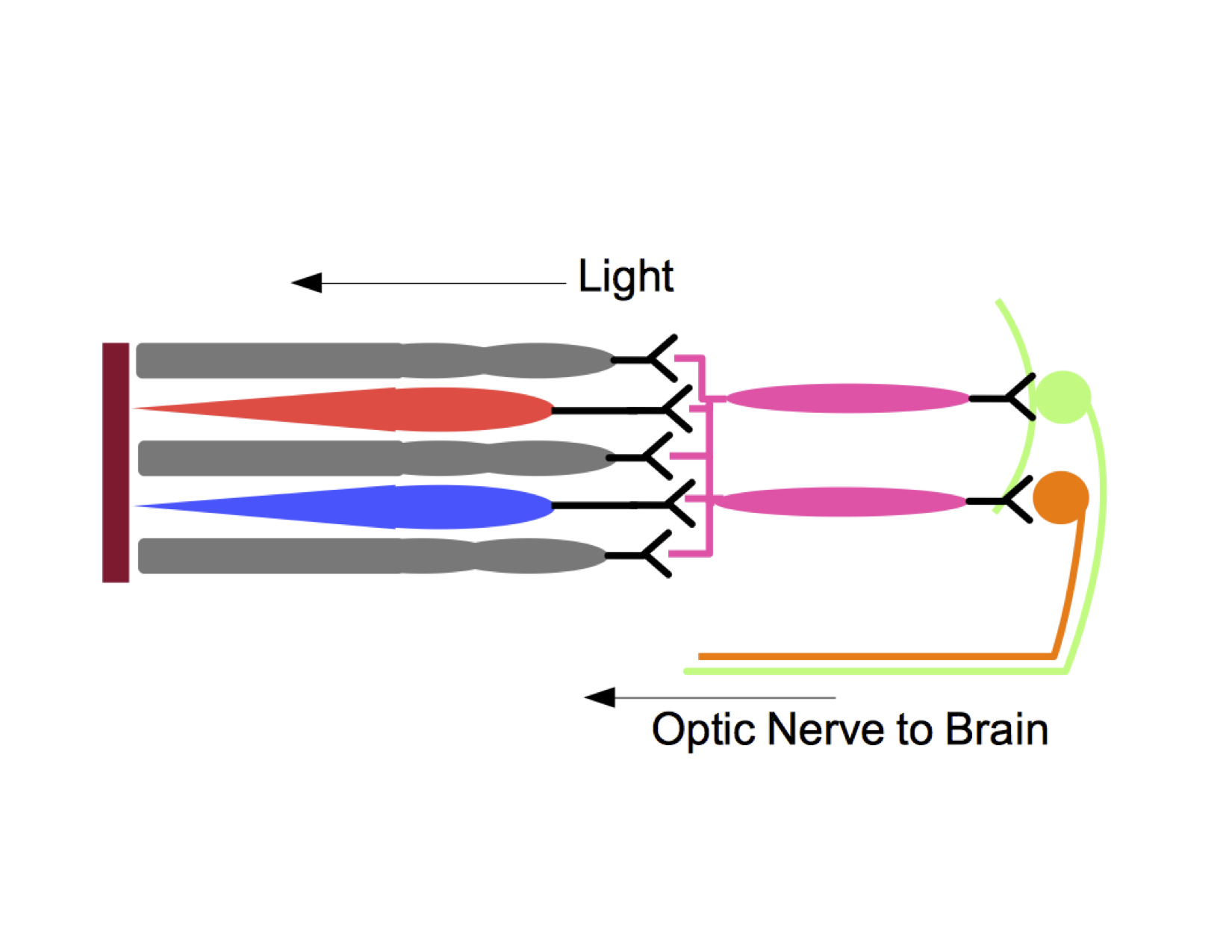
Light enters the eye and hits the retinal pigmented epithelium (maroon). This excites rods (grey) and cones (blue/red). These cells synapse onto bipolar cells (pink), which stimulate ipRGCs (green) and RGCs (orange). Both RGCs and ipRGCs transmit information to the brain through the optic nerve. Furthermore, light can directly stimulate the ipRGCs through its melanopsin photopigment. The ipRGCs uniquely project to the superchiasmatic nucleus, allowing the organism to entrain to light-dark cycles.

Hattar, armed with the knowledge that melanopsin was the photopigment responsible for the photosensitivity of ipRGCs, set out to study the exact role of the ipRGC in photoentrainment. In 2008, Hattar and his research team transplanted diphtheria toxin genes into the mouse melanopsin gene locus to create mutant mice that lacked ipRGCs. The research team found that while the mutants had little difficulty identifying visual targets, they could not entrain to light-dark cycles. These results led Hattar and his team to conclude that ipRGCs do not affect image-forming vision, but significantly affect non-image forming functions such as photoentrainment.

=== Distinct ipRGCs ===
Further research has shown that ipRGCs project to different brain nuclei to control both non-image forming and image forming functions. These brain regions include the SCN, where input from ipRGCs is necessary to photoentrain circadian rhythms, and the olivary pretectal nucleus (OPN), where input from ipRGCs control the pupillary light reflex. Hattar and colleagues conducted research that demonstrated that ipRGCs project to hypothalamic, thalamic, stratal, brainstem and limbic structures. Although ipRGCs were initially viewed as a uniform population, further research revealed that there are several subtypes with distinct morphology and physiology. Since 2011, Hattar's laboratory has contributed to these findings and has successfully distinguished subtypes of ipRGCs.

=== Diversity of ipRGCs ===
Hattar and colleges utilized Cre-based strategies for labeling ipRGCs to reveal that there are at least five ipRGC subtypes that project to a number of central targets. Five classes of ipRGCs, M1 through M5, have been characterized to date in rodents. These classes differ in morphology, dendritic localization, melanopsin content, electrophysiological profiles, and projections.

=== Diversity in M1 cells ===
Hattar and his co-workers discovered that, even among the subtypes of ipRGC, there can be designated sets that differentially control circadian versus pupillary behavior. In experiments with M1 ipRGCs, they discovered that the transcription factor Brn3b is expressed by M1 ipRGCs that target the OPN, but not by ones that target the SCN. Using this knowledge, they designed an experiment to cross Melanopsin-Cre mice with mice that conditionally expressed a toxin from the Brn3b locus. This allowed them to selectively ablate only the OPN projecting M1 ipRGCS, resulting in a loss of pupil reflexes. However, this did not impair circadian photo entrainment. This demonstrated that the M1 ipRGC consist of molecularly distinct subpopulations that innervate different brain regions and execute specific light-induced functions. This isolation of a 'labeled line' consisting of differing molecular and functional properties in a highly specific ipRGC subtype was an important first for the field. It also underscored the extent to which molecular signatures can be used to distinguish between RGC populations that would otherwise appear the same, which in turn facilitates further investigation into their specific contributions to visual processing.

== Psychological impact of light exposure ==
Previous studies in circadian biology have established that exposure to light during abnormal hours leads to sleep deprivation and disruption of the circadian system, which affect mood and cognitive functioning. While this indirect relationship had been corroborated, not much work had been done to examine whether there was a direct relationship between irregular light exposure, aberrant mood, cognitive function, normal sleep patterns and circadian oscillations. In a study published in 2012, the Hattar Laboratory was able to show that deviant light cycles directly induce depression-like symptoms and lead to impaired learning in mice, independent of sleep and circadian oscillations.

=== Effect on mood ===
ipRGCs project to areas of the brain that are important for regulating circadian rhythmicity and sleep, most notably the SCN, subparaventricular nucleus, and the ventrolateral preoptic area. In addition, ipRGCs transmit information to many areas in the limbic system, which is strongly tied to emotion and memory. To examine the relationship between deviant light exposure and behavior, Hattar and his colleagues studied mice exposed to alternating 3.5-hour light and dark periods (T7 mice) and compared them with mice exposed to alternating 12-hour light and dark periods (T24 mice). Compared to a T24 cycle, the T7 mice got the same amount of total sleep and their circadian expression of PER2, an element of the SCN pacemaker, was not disrupted. Through the T7 cycle, the mice were exposed to light at all circadian phases. Light pulses presented at night lead to expression of the transcription factor c-Fos in the amygdala, lateral habenula, and subparaventricular nucleus further implicating light's possible influence on mood and other cognitive functions.

Mice subjected to the T7 cycle exhibited depression-like symptoms, exhibiting decreased preference for sucrose (sucrose anhedonia) and exhibiting more immobility than their T24 counterparts in the forced swim test (FST). Additionally, T7 mice maintained rhythmicity in serum corticosterone, however the levels were elevated compared to the T24 mice, a trend that is associated with depression. Chronic administration of the antidepressant Fluoxetine lowered corticosterone levels in T7 mice and reduced depression-like behavior while leaving their circadian rhythms unaffected.

=== Effect on learning ===
The hippocampus is a structure in the limbic system that receives projections from ipRGCs. It is required for the consolidation of short-term memories into long-term memories as well as spatial orientation and navigation. Depression and heightened serum corticosterone levels are linked to impaired hippocampal learning. Hattar and his team analyzed the T7 mice in the Morris water maze (MWM), a spatial learning task that places a mouse in a small pool of water and tests the mouse's ability to locate and remember the location of a rescue platform located just below the waterline. Compared to the T24 mice, the T7 mice took longer to find the platform in subsequent trials and did not exhibit a preference for the quadrant containing the platform. In addition, T7 mice exhibited impaired hippocampal long-term potentiation (LTP) when subjected to theta burst stimulation (TBS). Recognition memory was also affected, with T7 mice failing to show preference for novel objects in the novel object recognition test.

=== Necessity of ipRGCs ===
Mice without (Opn4^{aDTA/aDTA} mice) are not susceptible to the negative effects of an aberrant light cycle, indicating that light information transmitted through these cells plays an important role in regulation of mood and cognitive functions such as learning and memory.

== Research developments ==
Light and melatonin

More recently, light therapy and melatonin administration have been explored by Alfred J. Lewy (OHSU), Josephine Arendt (University of Surrey, UK) and other researchers as a means to reset animal and human circadian rhythms. Additionally, the presence of low-level light at night accelerates circadian re-entrainment of hamsters of all ages by 50%; this is thought to be related to simulation of moonlight.

In the second half of 20th century, substantial contributions and formalizations have been made by Europeans such as Jürgen Aschoff and Colin Pittendrigh, who pursued different but complementary views on the phenomenon of entrainment of the circadian system by light (parametric, continuous, tonic, gradual vs. nonparametric, discrete, phasic, instantaneous, respectively).

Chronotypes

Humans can have a propensity to be morning people or evening people; these behavioral preferences are called chronotypes for which there are various assessment questionnaires and biological marker correlations.

Mealtimes

There is also a food-entrainable biological clock, which is not confined to the suprachiasmatic nucleus. The location of this clock has been disputed. Working with mice, however, Fuller et al. concluded that the food-entrainable clock seems to be located in the dorsomedial hypothalamus. During restricted feeding, it takes over control of such functions as activity timing, increasing the chances of the animal successfully locating food resources.

Diurnal patterns on the Internet

In 2018 a study published in PLoS ONE showed how 73 psychometric indicators measured on Twitter Content follow a diurnal pattern. A followup study appeared on Chronobiology International in 2021 showed that these patterns were not disrupted by the 2020 UK lockdown.

Modulators of circadian rhythms

In 2021, scientists reported the development of a light-responsive days-lasting modulator of circadian rhythms of tissues via Ck1 inhibition. Such modulators may be useful for chronobiology research and repair of organs that are "out of sync".

Neurological disorders

In 2021, scientists found that children with autism spectrum disorder are more likely to have disruptions in their sleep-wake cycle. Additionally, children with autism were also found more likely to have abnormal daily hormone cycles of cortisol, melatonin, and serotonin compared to the average person.

A 2017 study found that people with Attention deficit hyperactivity disorder (ADHD) often have a delayed sleep phase in their circadian rhythm, meaning that they go to sleep later than the average person. An earlier study from 2013 found similar results to the 2017 study, but also found a correlation between Seasonal affective disorder, ADHD, and sleeping problems.

Physical diseases and disorders

In 2015, a study on the frequency of gout attacks found that they occur over twice as often in the night and early morning than other times of day. A 2021 study on osteoporosis found that disruption of circadian rhythms (such as working night shifts) can lead to osteoporosis by disturbing bone remodeling that typically happens at night.

== Other fields ==
Chronobiology is an interdisciplinary field of investigation. It interacts with medical and other research fields such as sleep medicine, endocrinology, geriatrics, sports medicine, space medicine, psychiatry and photoperiodism.

== See also ==
- Bacterial circadian rhythms
- Biological clock (aging)
- Chrononutrition
- Circadian rhythm
- Circannual cycle
- Circaseptan, 7-day biological cycle
- Familial sleep traits
- Frank A. Brown, Jr.
- Hitoshi Okamura
- Homeostasis
- Light effects on circadian rhythm
- Photoperiodism
- Suprachiasmatic nucleus
- Scotobiology
- Time perception
- Malcolm von Schantz
