= Society for Research on Biological Rhythms =

The Society for Research on Biological Rhythms (SRBR) is a learned society and professional association headquartered in the United States created to advance the interests of chronobiology in academia, industry, education, and research. Formed in 1986, the society has around 1,000 members, and runs the associated academic journal, the Journal of Biological Rhythms. In addition to communicating with academic and public audiences on matters related to chronobiology, the society seeks to foster interdisciplinary exchange of ideas and advocates for the need for funding and research in biological rhythms to guide the development of related policies.

== Organisation ==
The society holds biennial meetings and informal gatherings, and participates in peer-reviewed science and evidence-based policy making. It is one of four prominent existing Chronology Research Societies and one of the 14 societies that make up The World Federation of Societies for Chronobiology. Through its journal, the Journal of Biological Rhythms, and meetings, the society engages scientists of all backgrounds and nationalities. It advocates the need for funding in research areas in biological rhythms and supports other research efforts such as the National Institutes of Health and National Science Foundation.

== Founding and early history ==
In 1986, Benjamin Rusak founded the Journal of Biological Rhythms. Rusak wanted an accompanying society that would hold meetings concerning research on biological rhythms, so he asked Fred W. Turek to organize the first meeting. The society was officially founded on November 12, 1986 by Fred Turek, Dave Hudson, Joe Takahashi, and Gene Block. The society is sometimes cited as being founded in 1988, as this was when the first meeting occurred.

Colin Pittendrigh, Turek's Ph.D. adviser, and one of the fathers of the field, was initially opposed to the society, worrying that it would have an isolating effect on the field rather than connecting it to related disciplines. Pittendrigh came around to the idea after the successful first meeting. Turek, however, believed that the field had advanced and diversified enough to justify a meeting that would unify the diverse field. Turek had been involved with the Endocrine Society, a research society that was 70 years old by 1986. He thought about this well established organisation when working in the early phases of SRBR, hoping to create a society with the ability to make a lasting impact. The first meeting was held at the Wild Dunes Resort and Conference Center in Charleston, SC, in May 1988. The Plenary Lecture at the first meeting was given by Michael Menaker.

== Meetings ==
Meetings for the Society of Research on Biological Rhythms occur once every two years, typically in May or June. The location of the meeting is determined by the president of the SRBR with the help of existing members. Meetings typically last four or five days and are open to all registered members. The meetings serve as a forum to share the latest research in biological rhythms, with hundreds of chronobiologist from around the world presenting at poster sessions and lectures. According to 2016 President Paul Hardin, the meeting is "an exceptional forum for hearing the latest cutting-edge research, reengaging with colleagues from years past, and exchanging ideas that will shape the future of the field with a talented and diverse group of chronobiologists from around the globe."

The last day of the meeting also features a keynote speaker referred to as the Pittendrigh/Aschoff speaker, named after notable chronobiologist Colin Pittendrigh and Jürgen Aschoff. Notable past Pittendrigh/Aschoff speakers include: Fred Turek, Joe Takahashi and Michael Young.

In addition to lectures and poster sessions, the meeting also serves as an opportunity to review the accomplishments of the society and its members over the previous two years, provide updates on the Journal for Biological Rhythms, introduce the incoming administration, and officially transfer the presidency to the president-elect.

=== List of meetings ===
Meeting Number	Dates	Location	President	Pittendrigh/Aschoff Speaker
1	May 11–14, 1988	Charleston, SC, USA	Fred W. Turek	N/A
2	May 9–13, 1990	Jacksonville, FL, USA	Fred W. Turek	N/A
3	May 6–10, 1992	Jacksonville, FL, USA	Fred W. Turek	N/A
4	May 4–8, 1994	Jacksonville, FL, USA	Robert Y. Moore	N/A
5	May 8–12, 1996	Jacksonville, FL, USA	Irving Zucker	N/A
6	May 6–10, 1998	Jacksonville, FL, USA	Gene D. Block	Serge Daan
7	May 10–13, 2000	Jacksonville, FL, USA	Jay Dunlap	John Woodland Hastings
8	May 22–26, 2002	Jacksonville, FL, USA	Rae Silver	Michael Menaker
9	June 24–26, 2004	Whistler, B.C., Canada	Steven Reppert	David Klein
10	May 21–25, 2006	Sandestin, FL, USA	William J. Schwartz	Michael Young
11	May 17–21, 2008	Sandestin, FL, USA	Martha Gillete	Ueli Schibler
12	May 22–26, 2010	Sandestin, FL, USA	Joseph Takahashi	Michael Rosbash
13	May 19–23, 2012	Sandestin, FL, USA	Mick Hastings	Joseph Takahashi
14	June 14–18, 2014	Big Sky, MT, USA	Carl Johnson	William J. Schwartz
15	June 21–25, 2016	Palm Harbor, FL, USA	Paul Hardin	Susan Golden
16	May 12–16, 2018	Amelia Island, FL, USA	Carla Green|	Charles Czeisler
17	May 30–June 3, 2020	Held Online	Erik Herzog	Amita Sehgal
18	May 14–18, 2022	Amelia Island, FL, USA	Amita Sehgal	Charlotte Helfrich-Förster
19	May 18–22, 2024	San Juan, PR, USA	Achim Kramer	Till Roenneberg

== Awards ==
The Society for Research on Biological Rhythms offers various awards and fellowships to researchers and trainees with diverse backgrounds from all over the world. Researchers and trainees must be participating in SRBR's biennial meeting to be considered.

=== Travel Fellowships & Awards ===
- International Travel Fellowships - This fellowship covers part of the travel costs for selected researchers and trainees from international countries. SRBR believes in the invaluable contributions the participation of a diverse group of researchers brings to its meetings. Trainees from economically disadvantaged countries are especially encouraged to apply.
- Diversity Travel Award - The SRBR provides awards funded by the NIH to cover part of the travel costs for selected researchers and trainees from certain backgrounds. Researchers with disabilities or from underrepresented backgrounds in the chronobiology field are strongly encouraged to apply.
- Trainee Travel Award - The SRBR gives two different awards to trainees based on excellence and merit: the Trainee Research Excellence Award and Trainee Research Merit Award. All submitted abstracts that fulfill criteria are automatically reviewed.

=== Junior Faculty Research Award ===
This award is given to principal investigators, usually newly independent researchers, for their exemplary work in the chronobiology field. Those eligible must be principal investigators at the Assistant Professor level (tenure-track) and must have published at least one notable paper on their research as a corresponding author.

Only those nominated by a SRBR member, excluding oneself or former lab members, are considered for this award.

=== Directors' Award ===
The SRBR gives Directors' Awards to honor those who have made significant contributions to the chronobiology field through their service, innovative research, and/or mentorship.

=== Notable past award recipients ===
A list of notable recipients of some of the awards described above:

Award	Year	Notable Award Recipients
Junior Faculty Research Award	2016	Carrie L. Partch, University of California, Santa Cruz.; Fumika N. Hamada, Cincinnati Children's Hospital Medical Center.
Directors' Award	2016	Michael Menaker, University of Virginia (Directors' Award for Mentoring); Patricia J. DeCoursey, University of South Carolina (Directors' Award for Research); David R. Weaver, University of Massachusetts Medical School (Directors' Award for Service)

== Governance ==
The Society for Research on Biological Rhythms is governed by a board of directors whose members consists of the following:

=== Board of directors ===
Current Executive Committee

- Horacio de la Iglesia, University of Washington - President
- John Hogenesch, Cincinnati Children's Hospital - President-Elect
- Christine Merlin - Treasurer
- Hiroki Ueda, RIKEN - Secretary

Members-at-Large

- Ilia Karatsoreos, Washington State University
- Ana Silva, Facultad de Ciencias, Universidad de la República
- Shin Yamazaki, University of Texas Southwestern Medical Center

=== Ex officio members ===
This is a list of Ex Officio members associated with the society and/or are committee chairs.

- Paul Hardin, Texas A&M University - Past President
- William Schwartz, Dell Medical School at The University of Texas at Austin - Editor, Journal of Biological Rhythms (JBR)
- Horacio de la Iglesia, University of Washington - 2018 Program Chair
- Nico Cermakian, McGill University - 2018 Fundraising Chair
- John Hogenesch, University of Pennsylvania, Perelman School of Medicine - Comptroller
- Ilia Karatsoreos, Washington State University - Professional Development Committee Chair
- Anna Wirz-Justice, University of Basel, Switzerland - ChronoHistory Chair
- Shelley Tischkau, Southern Illinois University School of Medicine - Communications Chair

== Membership ==
There are about 500 publicly listed members of the SRBR; the 2016 membership reached a record high of 702. All members must engage in research or training programs involving biological rhythms. The SRBR has three tiers of membership options:

1. Regular
2. Trainee
3. Emeritus

Regular Members enjoy benefits such as discounted registration for the SRBR meeting, online access to the Journal of Biological Rhythms and chronobiology teaching materials, and voting rights in SRBR officer and Executive Committee elections. Trainee Members, who must be enrolled in undergraduate, graduate, or postdoctoral training programs, pay lower membership fees than Regular Members, at the cost of forfeiting SRBR voting rights. Trainee Members also have opportunities to participate in Trainee Professional Development Day, dedicated to scientific and career development, and to apply for travel awards to Trainee Day. Emeritus Members must be retired from full-time employment, and must have been Regular Members for at least 10 years. They enjoy similar privileges to Regular Members; however, membership fees will be waived after 10 years of Emeritus Member status.

== Publications ==
=== Journal of Biological Rhythms ===
The Journal of Biological Rhythms has been the official journal for the Society for Research on Biological Rhythms since the founding of both in 1986. The JBR publishes scholarly articles, original research, and reviews on a variety of topics all centering around periodicity in organisms. The journal focuses on circadian and seasonal rhythms, but articles about other biological periods are published as well. A variety of approaches are explored by the journal including: genetic, behavioral, modeling, and clinical trials. In 2015 SAGE Publications gave JBR a five-year impact factor of 3.167 and a ranking of 19/86 in biology. The impact rating is a measure of how frequently the average article from the journal is cited. JBR is a member of the Committee on Publication Ethics.

=== JBRish ===
JBRish is a collection of editorials and letters written by Martin Zatz while he was editor of the Journal of Biological Rhythms. These are not scholarly articles about the science of biological rhythms; instead they focus on various aspects of life in academia and science. Some pieces are comedic or satirical in nature, and others are more serious. The collectors of the pieces, Anna Wirz-Justice and Irving Zucker, describe the selections as, "wistful, others poignant or trenchant, and an occasional one offers advice. They not infrequently document and lampoon trends and human foibles."

=== Newsletter ===
The Society for Research on Biological Rhythms publishes a newsletter two to three times a year. It contains a letter from the president of the society, recent developments in the field, and society business. The society business often includes programs for meetings, recent grants, and newsworthy events involving members. Recent newsletters can be viewed by non-members and can be found on the SRBR's website.
