= Dual circadian oscillator model =

Chronobiological model of entrainment

In the field of chronobiology (the study of circadian rhythms), the dual circadian oscillator model refers to a model of entrainment (where rhythmic events in an organism match oscillation in the environment) initially proposed by Colin Pittendrigh and Serge Daan. The dual oscillator model suggests the presence of two coupled circadian oscillators: E (evening) and M (morning). The E oscillator is responsible for entraining the organism's evening activity (activity offset) to dusk cues when the daylight fades, while the M oscillator is responsible for entraining the organism's morning activity (activity onset) to dawn cues, when daylight increases. The E and M oscillators operate in an antiphase relationship. As the timing of the sun's position fluctuates over the course of the year, the oscillators' periods adjust accordingly. Other oscillators, including seasonal oscillators, have been found to work in conjunction with circadian oscillators in order to time different behaviors in organisms such as fruit flies.

== Discovery ==
In 1966, Jürgen Aschoff, a German chronobiologist, observed that some animals exhibited two bouts of activity per day, one in the morning and one in the evening. These bouts of activity are defined by the animals' anticipation of the lights turning on or off. In 1976, Colin Pittendrigh and Serge Daan, two chronobiologists, first proposed a dual-oscillator model for nocturnal rodents as the mechanism for these E and M bouts of activity. The model hypothesized the presence of two separate oscillators that have opposite dependence on light intensity. Pittendrigh and Daan found that the M oscillator is synchronized to dawn and experiences acceleration from light, meaning that the period decreases with each subsequent cycle. The E oscillator, on the other hand, is synchronized to dusk and experiences deceleration from light, meaning that the period increases for each subsequent cycle. They postulated that the E&M model had an enhanced ability to adjust the circadian rhythm to the season and changes in day length. Pittendrigh and Daan found several limitations in the model of a single oscillator controlling sleep/wake behavior that led them to develop the dual oscillator model. The first key finding was the splitting behavior in the locomotor activity of hamsters under constant high intensity light conditions. The two separate bouts of activity indicated that more than one oscillator may be controlling locomotor activity. They also observed transient changes in the phase of sleep/wake behavior in Drosophila melanogaster following temperature changes. The lack of a new steady state rhythm suggested the presence of another temperature sensitive oscillator downstream of the known oscillator. These findings and others led Pittendrigh and Daan to propose the dual circadian oscillator model.

They examine slices of the hamster hypothalamus sectioned horizontally through the optic chiasm, in addition to the standard vertical (coronal) sections (Fig. 1). Whereas the coronal sections always gave a single plateau of increased activity that lasted 7 hours and occurred once a day, the horizontal sections generated a completely unexpected output: two peaks, each lasting about 4 hours, that were clearly separable.

Following Pittendrigh and Daan's behavioral characterization of the dual oscillator model, it took several years before scientists discovered the mechanistic basis of it. In 2000, Anita Jagota, Horacio de la Iglesia, and William J. Schwartz were the first group to show two distinct peaks of electrical activity in the mammalian suprachiasmatic nucleus (SCN) after studying horizontally sectioned hamster hypothalamus. Further experiments need to be conducted to validate that the two peaks represent the E and M oscillators. In 2004, Brigette Grima and Dan Stoleru independently investigated E and M activity peaks in Drosophila melanogaster (fruit flies) using different gene expression manipulations. They found two separate circadian neuron groups control the E and M peaks of activity in Drosophila melanogaster. They also found the lateral neurons are responsible for the morning and evening peaks. In 2007, Stoleru found that the M cells dominate the circadian rhythm on short days while the E cells dominate the rhythm on long days. This alternating domination pattern allows the circadian rhythms in animals to persist on both short and long days, respectively. Stoleru's work significantly contributed to the field of chronobiology by revealing the mechanism through which animals are able to adapt to environmental changes such as seasonal variations in daylight length. His research has also provided insights into the circadian clock's role in Seasonal Affective Disorder (SAD) and other related mood disorders that are responsive to light therapy.

== Background ==
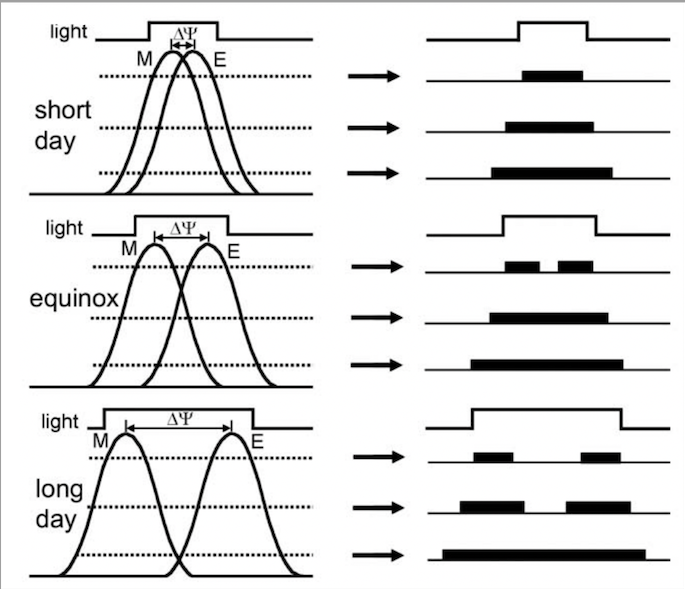
Diagram of day length affecting the phase relation between the two oscillators E and M and an actogram of a diurnal animal's activity. Less light (short day) results in overlap of the two oscillators' outputs, with a small phase difference, and thus, one bout of activity. More light (long day) results in the splitting of activity into two bouts with a large phase difference.

Distinctive features of the E&M dual oscillator model include alpha compression and the presence of an intermediate τ value. Each oscillator has a unique τ (tau) which is the period of an organism's sleep/wake cycle when they are in constant conditions with no environmental cues, also known as free-running. When coupled, these oscillators produce a distinct, observed free-running period known as an intermediate τ, which is a function of the E and M oscillator's respective τ values. Alpha compression, a term coined by Jürgen Aschoff, refers to the observation that under constant light conditions, the length of activity of nocturnal organisms shortens. The organism's duration of activity is called the alpha phase and typically measured in terms of locomotor activity. Alternatively, the alpha phase of diurnal organisms lengthens under constant light; this phenomenon is known as alpha expansion. Furthermore, alpha compression refers to the decreasing duration of activity before splitting occurs. Splitting is defined as the process by which one bout of activity separates into two, distinct bouts of activity, each free-running at a τ independent of the other. Pittendrigh observed that the M oscillator ran shorter after splitting compared to the E oscillator's relatively longer intrinsic period as indicated in the actogram, a diagram of the organism's daily rest and activity phases. After splitting occurs, the oscillators responsible for the two distinct activity bouts either recouple into one with an intermediate τ or stabilize at their new, separate τ values.

E and M cells possess different capabilities to control behavior and respond to light through either accelerating or decelerating their individual, internal circadian clock speeds. The difference in the phase angle of entrainment, or the relationship between the timing of the biological clock and the timing of the external time cue, of each cell varies depending on the amount of light in the environment. Greater amounts of light lead to a greater phase angle of entrainment. The amount of light and pigment dispersing factor (PDF) control the acceleration and deceleration of the speed of M and E cells, respectively. Furthermore, the coupling of the E and M oscillators increases as the phase angle of entrainment decreases, displaying an inverse relationship between the duration of light and the coupling of the two oscillators. This phenomenon also shows the importance of E and M cells for adapting the activity of an organism different photoperiods.

== Evidence in single-celled organisms ==
In single-celled dinoflagellates such as Gonyaulax polyedra, researchers have found evidence of circadian rhythms in bioluminescence, photosynthetic capacity, time of cell division, and enzyme synthesis rates. Bioluminescence can be expressed through either independent flashing or a continual glow. Both modes of bioluminescent expression are rhythmic and peak at different times. Researchers have hypothesized that the two rhythms operate under distinct pacemakers, as they appear to peak at different times under varying conditions (such as long vs. short days or a 23-hour vs. a 24-hour entraining period). Under constant conditions, the two rhythms in bioluminescence free-run with different periods, suggesting a dual-oscillator model, and they also appear to be coupled. However, the molecular mechanism of that coupling is not yet known.

== Evidence in Drosophila melanogaster ==
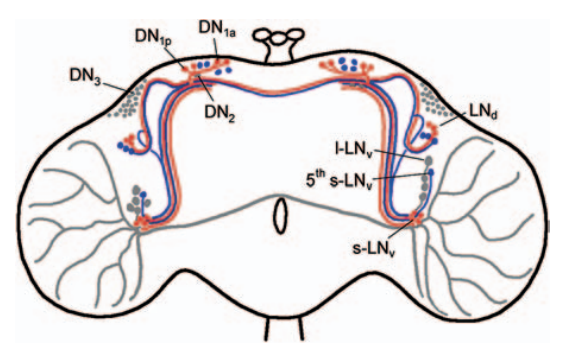
Lateral clock neurons (LNs) are shown at the junction between the central brain and optic lobes while dorsal clock neurons (DNs) are shown at the superior side of the brain. Note that individual cells have not been matched to the M or E oscillators yet, making this schematic a vague representation of the dual clock oscillator model.

Drosophila melanogaster, or fruit flies, show diurnal rhythms in locomotor activity that are corpuscular, meaning they exhibit both morning and evening peaks in activity that align with dawn and dusk. Both these bouts of activity are intrinsic and observed in constant darkness, although the morning peak is more pronounced during a light-dark cycle. Groups of lateral clock neurons in the Drosophila brain have been found to contain neurons responsible for these morning and evening peaks, indicating they could be the source for the M and E oscillators. Independent studies have found that the ventrolateral neurons anticipate lights-on while the dorsolateral neurons anticipate lights-off. Further studies have narrowed down the morning anticipation to four small ventrolateral neurons, which are the master clock during constant darkness and express pigment-dispersing factor (PDF). PDF is involved in the molecular coupling mechanism of M and E oscillators: M oscillator cells express PDF and entrain to dawn, while E cells receive PDF and become phase delayed, entraining to dusk.

However, other studies have shown that flies lacking lateral neurons still show residual morning and evening peaks, indicating that dorsal neurons play a role in evening and morning oscillations. Researchers have shown that rhythms of core clock proteins such as PER are the same in both morning and evening cells. During long days and high temperatures, scientists have observed phase advances in morning cells and phase delays in evening cells of molecular rhythms, potentially explaining how these cells determine different bouts of activity. However, there are other clock neurons found in fruit flies that do not function as E or M cells. In addition, other studies have found results inconsistent with the traditional dual oscillator model, suggesting a network of oscillators instead. These results have led some researchers to propose a plastic oscillator model in which different neurons can assume the role of E or M when needed.

Clock neurons in the fly brain entrain to external light stimuli via a cryptochrome (CRY) response pathway. In response to light exposure, CRY binds to the timeless (TIM) protein, ultimately leading to the degradation of TIM within the clock neuron and delaying the internal circadian oscillation of period (PER) and TIM proteins, meaning their onset and offset of activity occur later in the day.

The E and M oscillators in Drosophila are also theorized to have different temperature sensitivities. A group of chronobiologists found that the Drosophila morning activity peak synchronized to temperature increases in the morning, whereas the evening activity peak synchronized to the decrease in evening temperature. They also showed that the phase of the evening peak depended on temperature level, as the evening peak in activity was delayed at high temperatures. However, the morning peak was not influenced significantly by changes in temperature, suggesting that the E and M oscillators have different sensitivities to changes in temperature levels.

Circadian oscillators also work with seasonal oscillators to time behaviors such as daily activity throughout the year. For example, the expression of dper (the Drosophila per gene) and tim (Timeless (gene)) varies with temperature and length of day. Colder, shorter days increase the accumulation of mRNA transcripts for dper and tim, affecting the timing of evening activity and midday inactivity.

=== Lateral neurons ===
The lateral neurons (LN) are Drosophila's main clock neurons. When circadian oscillation was inhibited in clock neurons other than LNs, flies still maintained rhythmic activity in constant conditions. When this same inhibition was performed in LN cells, however, flies did not show rhythmic activity, demonstrating that LN cells are necessary for synchronized circadian rhythms in flies. LN neurons can be divided into three subgroups (LN_{d}, s-LN_{v}, 1-LN_{v}), which each perform different functions. Ablation of the s-LN_{v} cells caused a loss in the morning peak of fly activity, suggesting that this cell group functions as a morning oscillator. Meanwhile, ablation of the LN_{d} cells caused a loss in the evening peak, which suggests that this cell group functions as the evening oscillator. Furthermore, light inhibited s-LN_{v} cell outputs but excited LN_{d} cell outputs. These two cell types regulate circadian control under opposite conditions, providing further evidence for distinct morning and evening oscillator cells.

S-LN_{v} cells play another vital role in maintaining the circadian clock within flies. The majority of these cells produce pigment dispersing factor (PDF), a neurotransmitter that helps coordinate the various clock neurons in the fly brain. These s-LN_{v} cells within the clock network are required for synchronizing the different clock neurons in the absence of light.

=== Dorsal neurons ===
Dorsal neurons (DN) are several other groups of clock neurons within the fly brain. While DN cells do contribute to circadian control in light-dark cycles, they are not sufficient to produce rhythmicity in constant conditions. Therefore, these cells are not the primary morning or evening circadian clocks within the fly brain. Research has shown, however, that several subsets of DN cells can contribute to morning and evening peaks in activity.

When in constant dark and manipulated to overexpress the shaggy (sgg) gene, the Drosophila ortholog of GSK3, morning oscillator cells influenced the rate and rhythm of TIM transcription in evening oscillator cells. In constant light conditions, Drosophila overexpressing sgg in E cells remained rhythmic, while M cells became arrhythmic, like their WT counterparts. s-LN_{v} M cells cannot autonomously drive rhythmicity under constant light conditions and the E cells lacking the clock protein CRY that can independently drive rhythmicity in constant light cannot do so in constant darkness. Drosophila's clock is thought to consist of CRY-positive, s-LN_{v} M cells, and the CRY-negative E cells.

== Evidence in Neurospora crassa ==
Neurospora crassa, a type of fungus, have shown circadian rhythms in conidiation patterns when observed under constant darkness. These rhythms appear to be under the control of a transcription-translation feedback loop. The frequency (frq) gene, first discovered by Dr. Jerry Feldman, appears to control a TTFL which uses white collar 1 (WC-1) to respond to light cues. WC-1 then dimerizes with white collar 2 (WC-2) to form the white collar complex (WCC), which is a positive regulator of frq. The WCC binds to the frq promoter to enhance its transcription, increasing levels of FRQ protein. FRQ proteins, once phosphorylated, inhibit the WCC through a negative feedback mechanism. However, researchers have discovered rhythms in Neurospora cells without FRQ or WC-1 and WC-2. These cells are collectively referred to as FLOs (FRQ-less oscillators). One FLO that has been investigated further is the WC-FLO (WC-dependent FLO, specifically the ccg-16 gene). The discovered rhythm in mRNA accumulation required functional WC-1 and WC-2, which researchers suggested might indicate its coupling somehow to the FRQ/WCC oscillator loop. The WC-FLO can function independently, but the dependency of both the FRQ-based oscillator and WC-FLO suggested to researchers that the two oscillators might be coupled by the WC proteins. This coupling is analogous to the situation in Drosophila; researchers have proposed the model that the Neurospora M oscillator would be the light-sensitive FRQ/WCC oscillator that controls morning clock genes, while the E oscillator would be the WC-FLO oscillator that controls evening clock genes. This dual oscillator model would include WC-FLO receiving input both directly from the environment via WC-1 and indirectly through the FRQ/WCC oscillator, which is sensitive to both light and temperature.

== Evidence in mammals ==
According to the dual oscillator model, there are two oscillating circadian clocks located in the suprachiasmatic nucleus (SCN) of the mammalian hypothalamus. Their circadian oscillations are regulated by a negative feedback loop. The protein dimer CLOCK/BMAL1 regulates the products of clock genes Per and Cry, which, when present in high quantities, repress their own transcription. Other hypotheses for the existence of E and M oscillators in mammals involve single-cell dual oscillator models. Within a mammalian cell, there exists redundant copies of several clock genes (per1 and cry1; per2 and cry2). The hypothesis states that each set of these genes would be sufficient to produce endogenous oscillation in cell function; however, each gene set responds differently to light and temporal cues. The per1/cry1 oscillator (morning oscillator) is energized by light and tracks dawn. Conversely, the per2/cry2 oscillator is energized by darkness and tracks dusk.

=== Rodents ===
Significant progress has been made in chronobiologists' understanding of the neural and molecular mechanisms underlying the dual oscillator model and function in mice. Mice are nocturnal animals whose activity is compressed under long photoperiods and extended under short photoperiods. The dual oscillator model that has been developed for mice and other nocturnal rodents posits that two separate circadian oscillators drive the organism's activity in their unique responses to light. One possibility is that each mouse SCN cell contains both an E and an M oscillator. Evidence for this version of the dual oscillator model lie in the respective peaks of Per1, Per2, Cry1, and Cry2 mRNAs, demonstrating different patterns of oscillation. In reference to the Per gene, Per1 mRNA peaks around circadian time (CT) 4, while Per2 mRNA peaks six hours later at CT10. Circadian time (CT) indicates the amount of time after the start of the animal's subjective day. Similarly, Cry1 mRNA has been shown to peak earlier than Cry2 mRNA. These differences in oscillation support the interpretation that the Per1/Cry1 negative feedback loop represents the timing of the M oscillator, while the Per2/Cry2 feedback loop represents the timing of the E oscillator. Furthermore, the dual oscillator model predicts that upon illumination, the M oscillator will accelerate while the E oscillator decelerates. This proposed pattern of oscillation, as measured in Per and Cry mRNA levels, has been observed in multiple experiments in mice, and suggests that both E and M oscillators are present in each SCN cell.

Another possibility is that the mixture of neurons that make up the SCN contain either an E oscillator or an M oscillator. Evidence for this model comes from an experiment conducted in Syrian hamsters in which slices of SCN cut in this horizontal plane oscillated with distinct morning and evening peaks in electrical activity. These results suggest that E and M oscillators may be located in the rostrocaudal plane of the SCN. The distinct Per2 mRNA oscillations in sections from both the rostral and caudal regions of the SCN (caudal Per2 peaks around lights on, rostral Per2 peaks around lights off) indicate that an M oscillator may be present in the caudal SCM and an E oscillator may be present in the rostral SCN. Similar phase differences in Per1 mRNA oscillations have been observed between the rostral and caudal SCN in mice, suggesting the presence of separate E oscillator neurons and M oscillator neurons in the mouse SCN. In addition, rats exposed to a 22-hour light-dark cycle show two distinct locomotor rhythms with distinct periods. In these rats, the dorsal and ventral SCN had different periods in the expression of clock genes, suggesting two oscillators in different regions of the SCN.

=== Humans ===
Evidence for the dual oscillator model in humans is related to changes in melatonin secretion. A mechanism previously proposed for rodents posits that scotoperiod, the duration of night, can induce changes in nocturnal melatonin secretion, and that this results from an adjustment in the timing of two circadian oscillators. Similarly, duration of nocturnal melatonin secretion in humans has been shown to respond to changes in scotoperiod, and changes in nocturnal secretion duration result mainly from the time of morning secretion offset. These results also suggest that the dual oscillator model may explain the human regulation of melatonin secretion, as well as other functions. Furthermore, bimodal patterns of melatonin levels have been observed, but mostly in women with seasonal pathology. These observed morning and evening peaks in plasma melatonin levels provide physical substrates for, and adds to the plausibility of, the dual oscillator model in humans. Additional work with human melatonin secretion has shown that its onset and offset (occurring in the evening and morning, respectively) have opposing effects on phase following melatonin administration; morning melatonin secretion enhanced morning light exposure's effect on advancing secretion onset.

The alternating domination by the E and M oscillators depending on daylight duration produces seasonal changes in internal, biological processes like reproduction. Human conception rates increase at certain times of the year, a pattern that also varies with how developed the country is. Melatonin secretion levels, previously shown to potentially be affected by the dual oscillator, can have behavioral impacts as well. Research on seasonal affective disorder (SAD) has shown that men with SAD have longer melatonin secretion in the winter than healthy men; however, women with SAD vs. without SAD showed opposite trends. While there have been conflicting findings from circadian research on SAD, reliable studies have found evidence for circadian phase delays in SAD. The corresponding phase-delay hypothesis suggests that manipulating timing of light exposure could counteract the phase delay, impacting the dual oscillator system and producing a therapeutic effect.

== Evidence in other organisms ==
There is no substantial evidence for distinct morning and evening oscillator cells in plants, fungi, or cyanobacteria. However, several single-cell dual oscillator models exist, providing alternative models to explain responses to changes in light stimuli. In systems of multiple oscillators, there are often "pacemaker" and "slave" oscillators in which the slave oscillator is entrained by the pacemaker and does not necessarily have all the circadian features of a central oscillator. For example, a proposed alternative to the traditional dual-coupled oscillator model in cyanobacteria's Kai protein system is a damped oscillator containing an autonomous post-transcriptional oscillator (PTO). While the damped oscillator regulates the TTFL, the PTO would act as a central circadian oscillator.

Other alternatives to the dual oscillator model include oscillators which contain feedback loops. Studies in Arabidopsis thaliana have shown that its plant circadian clock is composed of multiple interlocking TTFLs which include transcription factors whose expressions peak in the evening and morning.

Dual coupled oscillators have been discovered in the Leucophaea maderae (cockroach) optic lobes and the Aplysia or Bulla (marine molluscs) eyes.

== Limitations of the Dual Oscillator model ==
The E&M oscillator model is one of the most prominent models in chronobiology. While useful to explain flies' adjustments between short and long days, the model is limited by its simplicity.

Some studies have shown that E cells can each drive multiple activity components without M cells. In 2009, experiments were performed in Drosophila with period gene expression restricted to the 5th s-LN_{v} and 3 LN_{d}s lateral neurons, cells thought to belong to the E oscillator. Ablation of PDF-positive s-LN_{v} cells did not remove the M peak as expected. Despite limited Period protein-expressing cells, under low light conditions, the flies still expressed normal bimodal activity patterns, with up to 3 free-running components. They differed only in the phase of the E and M peaks. 2 LN_{d} advanced upon moonlight, acting as an M oscillator, and 5th s-LN_{v} and 1 LN_{d} delayed upon moonlight, acting as E. The researchers suggested that M and E characteristics could be flexible to environmental conditions and should not be interpreted strictly or restricted to certain clock neurons.

In certain conditions, M cells have also been found to drive both M and E activity peaks at high light intensity and temperature. Researchers reasoned that the cells studied were not solely M oscillators or varying environmental conditions influence their behavior to resemble either M or E cells. Other more complex models being developed include a multi-oscillator system composed of flexible M and E cells or a clock neuron network without specific M and E assignments.

== See also ==
- Chronobiology
- Circadian rhythm
- Colin Pittendrigh
- Cryptochrome
- Drosophila Melanogaster
- Period (gene)
- Suprachiasmatic nucleus (SCN)
- Jürgen Aschoff
- Pigment dispersing factor (PDF)
