= Mary E. Harrington =

American chronobiologist

- Born: Valparaiso, Indiana
- Education: Pennsylvania State University (B.S., 1980), University of Toronto (M.A., 1982), Dalhousie University (Ph.D., 1986)
- Scientific career
- Fields: Chronobiology
- Thesis: Behavioral, anatomical and physiological studies of the geniculo-suprachiasmatic tract in the golden hamster

Mary E. Harrington is an American chronobiologist, the chair of neuroscience program and Tippit Professor in the Life Sciences at Smith College and also the editor-in-chief for the Journal of Biological Rhythms.

== Background ==
After completing her Ph.D., Harrington conducted postdoctoral research at Dalhousie University from 1986 to 1987, working with Dr. Benjamin Rusak. In 1987, she joined Smith College as an assistant professor in the Department of Psychology. She was promoted to associate professor in 1995 and became a full professor in 2003. In 2005, she was appointed as the Tippit Professor in the Life Sciences. Starting from 2014, Harrington has served as Director of the Neuroscience Program at Smith College.

Since 1987, Harrington has been a member of the Neuroscience and Behavior Program at University of Massachusetts at Amherst (UMass Amherst). Since 2000, she becomes an adjunct member at UMass Amherst's Center for Neuroendocrine Studies.

== Key contributions ==
=== Research and findings ===
In September 1986, Harrington published her Ph.D. thesis, "Behavioral, anatomical and physiological studies of the geniculo-suprachiasmatic tract in the golden hamster" at Dalhousie University. It focused on geniculo-suprachiasmatic tract neurons and how light input altered responsiveness of the circadian rhythm to photic information.

In 1986, Harrington visited Patricia J. DeCoursey's lab as a postdoc and spent several months setting her up to conduct immunocytochemical studies. DeCoursey was a pioneer female scientist in chronobiology for years, especially known for defining the phase response curve.

Besides the role as a researcher, Harrington dedicates her time as a mentor. She teaches about neuroanatomy, sensory systems, Alzheimer's disease, and experimental methods in neuroscience and is open to include undergraduate researchers in her lab. Harrington is also vocal about the general science community which she participated in SfN Annual meeting 2016 and advocated "Optimizing Experimental Design for High-Quality Science".

In 2020, Harrington became the Editor-in-Chief of the Journal of Biological Rhythms, sponsored by the Society for Research on Biological Rhythms (SRBR). Harrington is also part of the program Community 4 Rigor, an NIH funded project to improve rigor in science. She believed that working against bias is the key for scientific research.

== Awards and honors ==
Harrington is a member of Phi Beta Kappa, Psi Chi, Sigma Xi, one of the most prestigious international honor societies in psychology. During her graduate studies, she received multiple fellowships. At the University of Toronto, where she earned her master's degree in psychology (1981–1982), she was a recipient of the Connaught Fellowship. She later pursued a doctorate in psychology at Dalhousie University (1982–1986), researching on the "Behavioral, anatomical, and physiological studies of the geniculo-suprachiasmatic tract in the golden hamster," and was awarded with the Killam Fellowship.

In 1994, Harrington won the Research Career Development Award by the National Institutes of Health (NIH) grant in recognition of her contributions as an early-career investigator. She joined Smith College as an assistant professor in 1987 and became a Fellow of the Faculty for Undergraduate Neuroscience in 2003. In 2005, she was appointed Tippit Professor in the Life Sciences at Smith College. Her contributions to neuroscience research and inspiring future scientists led to her presidency of the Faculty for Undergraduate Neuroscience in 2007, the same year she received the Sherrerd Prize for Distinguished Teaching. In 2022, she was awarded the Society for Research on Biological Rhythm (SRBR) Director's Award for Service in recognition of her contributions to the field of chronobiology.

== Selected publications ==
- Davidson, Alec J.; Castanon-Cervantes, Oscar; Leise, Tanya L.; Molyneux, Penny C.; Harrington, Mary E. (2009). "Visualizing jet lag in the mouse suprachiasmatic nucleus and peripheral circadian timing system". European Journal of Neuroscience. 29 (1): 171–180. doi:10.1111/j.1460-9568.2008.06534.x. ISSN 1460-9568. PMID 19032592.
- Harrington, MARY E (1997-01-01). "The Ventral Lateral Geniculate Nucleus and the Intergeniculate Leaflet: Interrelated Structures in the Visual and Circadian Systems". Neuroscience & Biobehavioral Reviews. 21 (5): 705–727. doi:10.1016/S0149-7634(96)00019-X. ISSN 0149-7634. PMID 9353800.
- Martin-Burgos, Blanca; Wang, Wanqi; William, Ivana; Tir, Selma; Mohammad, Innus; Javed, Reja; Smith, Stormi; Cui, Yilin; Arzavala, Jessica; Mora, Dalilah; Smith, Ciearra B.; van der Vinne, Vincent; Molyneux, Penny C.; Miller, Stephen C.; Weaver, David R. (2022-02-01). "Methods for Detecting PER2:LUCIFERASE Bioluminescence Rhythms in Freely Moving Mice". Journal of Biological Rhythms. 37 (1): 78–93. doi:10.1177/07487304211062829. ISSN 0748-7304. PMC 9282071. PMID 34873943.
- Merrow, Martha; Harrington, Mary (2020-10-14). "A functional context for heterogeneity of the circadian clock in cells". PLOS Biology. 18 (10) e3000927. doi:10.1371/journal.pbio.3000927. ISSN 1545-7885. PMC 7671520. PMID 33052900.
- Nicholls, Shannon K.; Casiraghi, Leandro P.; Wang, Wanqi; Weber, E. Todd; Harrington, Mary E. (2019-06-27). "Evidence for Internal Desynchrony Caused by Circadian Clock Resetting". The Yale Journal of Biology and Medicine. 92 (2): 259–270. ISSN 1551-4056. PMC 6585527. PMID 31249487.
- Skapetze, Lea; Owino, Sharon; Lo, Eng H.; Arai, Ken; Merrow, Martha; Harrington, Mary (2023-06-01). "Rhythms in barriers and fluids: Circadian clock regulation in the aging neurovascular unit". Neurobiology of Disease. 181 106120. doi:10.1016/j.nbd.2023.106120. ISSN 0969-9961. PMID 37044366.
