= Carla Green =

American neurobiologist and chronobiologist

- Born: May 14, 1962 (age 64); Cheyenne, Wyoming
- Education: Southwest Missouri State University
- Employer: University of Texas Southwestern Medical Center
- Known for: Work on circadian rhythms in both Xenopus and mammals.

Carla Beth Green (born 1962) is an American neurobiologist and chronobiologist. She is a professor in the Department of Neuroscience and a Distinguished Scholar in Neuroscience at the University of Texas Southwestern Medical Center. She is the former president of the Society for Research on Biological Rhythms (SRBR), as well as a satellite member of the International Institute for Integrative Sleep Medicine at the University of Tsukuba in Japan.

Her research involves the circadian clock and how it controls rhythmic processes within the cell using molecular mechanisms. The general focus of the Green Lab is to understand the molecular mechanism of the mammalian circadian clock and how it mediates rhythmicity within the physiology, biochemistry, and behavior of an organism. Her lab currently has three main projects: identifying targets and mechanisms of expression regulation of the nocturnin gene; identifying the mechanism of metabolic control of Nocturnin knockout lean mice; and defining structural components of the repressor protein cryptochrome and how regulation of the nuclear entry of the protein contributes to circadian period length.

Green has formal training in cell biology, biochemistry, and molecular biology, which has given her a broad skill set to further expand her areas of study such as genomics, proteomics, structural biology, and metabolic studies over the course of her career.

Aside from her scientific focuses, she also contributes to the greater science community. At the June 23–28, 2019 Gordon Research Conference, “Clocks in Model Organisms: Circadian Networks, Physiology and Health,” she is organizing the “GRC Power Hour,” a panel designed to promote diversity and inclusion for women and minorities in the STEM field as well as encourage the professional growth of all members from all communities by providing a space for discussion and mentorship.

== Background ==
Green was born in Cheyenne, Wyoming on May 14, 1962. After spending some time in Wyoming with her mother during her early years, Green's family moved frequently—first to Denver, Colorado; then to Saint Paul, Minnesota; and finally to Springfield, Missouri when she was in first grade. She remained in Springfield throughout her adolescence before attending Southwest Missouri State University, where she graduated in 1984 with a bachelor's degree in biology. Remaining at Southwest Missouri State, she also received her master's degree in biology in 1986. After receiving her master's, Green left Springfield to attend the University of Kansas Medical Center in Kansas City, where she received her Ph.D. in Biochemistry and Molecular Biology working with Simon Kwok. From 1991-1996, she was a Postdoctoral Fellow with Joseph Besharse in the Department of Anatomy and Cell Biology at the University of Kansas Medical Center, where she worked on the molecular mechanisms of circadian rhythmicity in the retinal photoreceptors of Xenopus laevis. In 1997 she joined the faculty in the Department of Biology at the University of Virginia, continuing her work on circadian rhythms in both Xenopus and mammals. More specifically, she studied the molecular and cellular mechanisms that comprise and regulate the circadian oscillator in vertebrates.

Green was first exposed to chronobiology when she was a graduate student at the University of Kansas Medical Center. At the time, she had not been working on the subject, but heard a seminar by Joseph Besharse, who had just been recruited to the University as the new Chair of Cell Biology in 1989. She had been finishing up her Ph.D. degree and was looking for postdoctoral positions in Kansas City. When Green heard about the novel field of circadian clocks, this intrigued her. Besharse had been speaking about his work on the endogenous clock in the retinas of Xenopus. In those days, nothing was known about the molecular mechanism of circadian clocks in any system. She had been trained as a biochemist and molecular biologist, and thought that this field would be a perfect place to use her skills to work on such a fascinating biological anomaly. Besharse hired her as a postdoctoral student in his lab and she has been studying circadian clocks ever since.

Green is married to Joseph Takahashi, who is the current chair of the Department of Neuroscience at the University of Texas Southwestern Medical Center.

== Career ==
=== Positions held ===
- 1995-1997 Research Assistant Professor, Department of Anatomy and Cell Biology, University of Kansas Medical Center
- 1997-2003 Assistant Professor, Department of Biology, University of Virginia
- 2003-2007 Associate Professor, Department of Biology, University of Virginia
- 2007-2009 Professor, Department of Biology, University of Virginia
- 2009–present Professor, Department of Neuroscience, UT Southwestern

=== Research ===
Green is currently a principal investigator in the Department of Neuroscience at the University of Texas Southwestern Medical Center. Her lab studies the molecular mechanism of circadian rhythms in mammals, with a specific interest in the regulatory mechanisms that modulate translational and post-transcriptional processes. The Green Lab is currently focused on understanding the circadian function of Nocturnin, the circadian regulation of metabolism, and the circadian structure and function of cryptochrome's core components.

==== Nocturnin ====
A major focus in the Green lab has been on a protein encoded by the Nocturnin gene, named for its high-level nighttime expression. Nocturnin is a deadenylase thought to be involved in the degradation of mRNA polyA tails, suggesting that it plays a role in post-transcriptional stability and regulation of circadian gene expression, which is most beneficial to the metabolism and ultimately, survival of an organism.

In 1996, Green discovered nocturnin (Noc) in the retinal photoreceptors of Xenopus laevis, where Noc mRNA displayed rhythmic expression in an isolated Xenopus eye in light/dark and constant conditions. They isolated this gene by using a high stringency differential display screen for rhythmic genes in the Xenopus retina. In 2001, Green found Noc homologues in other species such as mice with a high degree coding sequence similarity. Since expanding these studies into mice, they have shown that mouse Nocturnin mRNA is also rhythmic and expressed in many circadian clock-containing tissues. Interestingly, Green's group has shown that though Noc is not directly involved in regulating the master clock gene expression, it is required for oscillator output functions thereby contributing to circadian physiology.

The rhythmic expression of nocturnin (Noc) is seen throughout the body, notably in tissues crucial for metabolism like the liver and intestine. In 2011, Green, Douris, and others were able to show differing Noc phenotypes have emerged implicating involvement of this gene in osteogenesis, lipogenesis, and adipogenesis.

Her lab's current research focuses on identifying Nocturnin's circadian-relevant mRNA targets and understanding how it goes about regulating their expression.

==== Post-transcriptional control of circadian rhythms ====
In 2011, Green's lab concluded that transcriptional and post-transcriptional processes are necessary to generate robust circadian rhythms of mRNA expression, but understandings of circadian post-transcriptional mechanisms lag far behind understandings of clock regulation at the transcriptional level. This was found to be due to the lack of well-developed methodologies to find post-transcriptionally regulated genes on a large scale. The authors believe that development of such methods is likely to lead to the discovery of many more genes and mechanisms that are under post-transcriptional control.

Green's findings are cited in more recent developments on post-transcriptional control of the mammalian circadian clock. Recent findings in 2016 inspired by Green's research contribute to post-transcriptional control of human circadian systems in relation to chronomedicine and sleep disorders.

==== Cryptochrome ====
Green's lab has focused heavily on a class of proteins known as cryptochromes, which are blue light receptor proteins found in both plants and animals. Cryptochrome proteins are essential for the proper functioning of the circadian clock in insects and mammals, and for proper development in plants. Cryptoproteins regulate the circadian clocks of plants, insects, and mammals in different ways. Green has worked extensively with an amphibian, the African clawed frog (or Xenopus laevis), as well as mammalian CRY1 and CRY2, to try and uncover the mysteries of these essential transcriptional repressors.

Green's research on cryptochromes began in 2003, when she and colleagues investigated the role of cryptochrome in suppressing the activation of other circadian clock genes such as CLOCK and BMAL1. They revealed that the deletion of cryptochrome's C-terminal domain resulted in proteins unable to suppress activation of these genes. This result indicates that the C-terminal is not the domain of suppression of CLOCK/BMAL1, but is essential only for nuclear localization.

Green has also studied the relationship between the suprachiasmatic nucleus and peripheral circadian oscillators, in which cryptochrome plays a key role. The regulatory region of Cry1, for instance, contains a response region for the Glucocorticoid hormone, such that input of this hormone can activate transcription of Cry1. In Cry1/Cry2 null mice, regular feeding at 24 hour intervals can induce circadian expression of many transcripts, especially those related to metabolism. This shows how peripheral oscillators can bypass the usual circadian feedback loops of the central oscillator.

More recently, in 2018, Green contributed to the discovery of a new co-factor which mediates regulation through direct interaction with CLOCK and BMAL1. This study provides a model for the evolutionary mechanism by which the structure of cryptochromes, and thus clock regulatory mechanisms, varies.

== Awards and honors ==
- 1990 Joe R. Kimmel Research Award for Outstanding Research, University of Kansas Medical Center
  - This award is given to students for outstanding research in Biochemistry and Molecular Biology.
- 1997 C.J. Herrick Award for Outstanding Young Investigator in Comparative Neurobiology
  - This award recognizes young researchers who have made significant contributions to the field of comparative neuroanatomy and display promise for future success in the field.
- 2005 American Association for the Advancement of Science (AAAS) Fellow
  - Fellows are elected in recognition of their achievements across scientific disciplines and their dedication and commitment to the advancement of science.
- 2009 Distinguished Scholar in Neuroscience, UT Southwestern
