= Joseph Takahashi =

American medical investigator (born 1951)

Joseph S. Takahashi
- Born: December 16, 1951 (age 74); Tokyo, Japan
- Education: Swarthmore College; University of Oregon
- Known for: Discovering CLOCK gene
- Awards: Gruber Prize in Neuroscience (2019); W. Alden Spencer Award (2001); Ariëns Kappers Medal (1995)
- Scientific career
- Fields: Genetics; Neurobiology
- Workplaces: UT Southwestern; Howard Hughes Medical Institute

Joseph S. Takahashi is a Japanese American neurobiologist and geneticist. Takahashi is a professor at University of Texas Southwestern Medical Center as well as an investigator at the Howard Hughes Medical Institute. Takahashi's research group discovered the genetic basis for the mammalian circadian clock in 1994 and identified the Clock gene in 1997. Takahashi was elected to the National Academy of Sciences in 2003.

== Biography ==
Takahashi graduated from Richard Montgomery High School in Rockville, Maryland in 1970. Takahashi attended Swarthmore College and graduated with a degree in biology in 1974. He worked with Patricia DeCoursey at the University of South Carolina for a year after graduation and then applied to work with Michael Menaker at the University of Texas, Austin. Menaker ultimately moved to the University of Oregon where Takahashi received his neuroscience Ph.D. in 1981.

Takahashi was a postdoctoral fellow at the National Institute of Mental Health for two years under Martin Zatz before assuming a faculty position in Northwestern University's Department of Neurobiology and Physiology in 1983, where he held a 26-year tenure. Takahashi joined the faculty at the University of Texas Southwestern Medical Center at Dallas in 2008 as their Loyd B. Sands Distinguished Chair in Neuroscience. Takahashi also serves as a member of the Scientific Advisory Board of Hypnion Inc., a company focused on the development of novel therapeutics for central nervous system disorders affecting sleep and wake-alertness, as well as circadian rhythm abnormalities. He also serves as a member of the editorial boards of Neuron, Physiological Genomics and Journal of Biological Rhythms.

== Research contributions ==
=== Studies of the SCN--the circadian pacemaker ===
In the early 1980s, Takahashi and Menaker studied the bird pineal gland culture system in vitro to understand circadian oscillations, and they demonstrated that the suprachiasmatic nucleus (SCN) of the hypothalamus, which had been identified as the control center for circadian rhythms in mammals, played the same role in birds. The authors also collaborated with DeCoursey and used hamsters to demonstrate that the photoreceptor system responsible for entrainment of circadian rhythms is different from that of the visual system.

In 2010 Takahashi, Buhr, and Yoo examined the potential of temperature fluctuations to entrain biological oscillators. The finding that the master circadian pacemaker, a robust oscillator which is typically only entrained by environmental light/dark cycles, was also capable of entraining to temperature fluctuations when isolated in vitro indicates that temperature resetting is a fundamental property of all mammalian clocks and likely works through a highly conserved mechanism in all mammalian cells. This also suggests that body temperature rhythms, as controlled by the SCN in homeothermic mammals, is a potential mechanism through which the master clock may synchronize circadian oscillators within tissues throughout the body.

=== Studies of circadian properties of mammalian clock genes ===
Takahashi's research has led to many developments in understanding how the circadian clock of mammals affects physiology and relationships with the environment. In 1993, Takahashi and Michael Greenberg studied the mechanisms of mammalian suprachiasmatic nuclei entrainment to environmental light cycles. They explored the relationship between phosphorylated cyclic adenosine monophosphate response element binding protein (CREB) and c-fos transcription, a protein previously indicated as a component of the photic entrainment pathway. Using immunoprecipitation, Takahashi and Greenberg were able to show that light induced CREB phosphorylation occurs only during the subjective night. Given that CREB has been shown to regulate c-fos transcription in PC12 pheochromocytoma cells, Takahashi and Greenberg were able to conclude that phosphorylation of CREB in the SCN may play an important role in mammalian photic entrainment.

After the in vitro research on the pineal gland culture system used to understand circadian oscillations, the limitations of the cell culture system were evident and Takahashi switched methods to begin using forward genetics and positional cloning—tools which required no advanced knowledge of the underlying mechanism—to understand the genetic and molecular bases of circadian rhythms. Using mutated mouse strains, Takahashi and his colleagues isolated strains with abnormal period length and discovered the clock gene in 1994. They cloned the mammalian circadian clock gene in 1997.

In 2000, Takahashi made what he calls one of his most significant contributions to the field, which was the cloning of the mutant tau gene identified in 1988 by Menaker and Martin Ralph. Since its discovery in 1988, the tau gene had been studied thoroughly, however, due to limited genomic resources in hamsters, the organism in which it was discovered, a problem existed preventing further study. Through the use of a genetically directed representational difference analysis (GDRDA), the fragments of DNA that differed between the mutant and wild type hamsters. With this information, Takahashi then used positional syntenic cloning to identify synteny with the human genome. This revealed that the gene is closely related to the gene doubletime (dbt) in Drosophila, and casein kinase 1 epsilon (CKIe) in humans, both of which interact with and regulate PER levels.

=== Non-circadian phenotypes of the clock mutant mouse ===
Since identifying the clock mutant in 1994, Takahashi has continued his research on this mutation and has applied it to studying clinical disorders, such as irregular sleep homeostasis and obesity.

In 2000, he and his colleagues at Northwestern recognized that clock mutant mice slept 1 to 2 hours less per night than wild type mice. Additionally, because these mice lack the circadian system that regulates consolidated sleep at a certain time of day, sleep in clock mutants is spread out throughout the day in both light-dark cycles and in complete darkness. This mutation results in less REM sleep and more time spent in earlier sleep phases.

In 2005, he collaborated with Joseph Bass and reported the effects of mutations in the clock gene on the metabolism and physiology of mice. Their experiments compared weight gain in Clock mutant mice to that of control mice and showed that mutant mice were more likely to gain weight. Such a discovery influenced them to pursue exploration of the clock gene's role in appetite and energy. In Clock mutant mice, they reported depressed levels of orexin, a neuropeptide involved in regulation of eating. This result provides further evidence that the clock gene has a profound impact on metabolic processes in mice.

It has since been discovered that metabolism itself plays a role in regulating the clock. In 2009, Joseph Bass in collaboration with Takahashi's group discovered that nicotinamide phosphoribosyltransferase (NAMPT) mediated synthesis of metabolic coenzyme nicotinamide adenine dinucleotide (NAD^{+}), which both oscillate on a daily cycle, may play an important role in regulating circadian activity. By measuring the oscillations of NAMPT and NAD^{+} levels in the livers of both wild-type and mutant mice they determined that oscillations in NAMPT regulated NAD^{+} which in turn regulated the deacetylase SIRT1.

=== Continued mutagenesis studies ===
Using mutagenesis screens (forward genetics) found both the clock mutant mouse and the tau mutant hamster. Takahashi's lab has continued use of this method in order to lead to discoveries of the role of the circadian clock in vision, learning, memory, stress, and addiction, among other behavioral properties.

In 2007, Takahashi and his colleagues at Northwestern ran a forward mutagenesis screen in mice looking for variations in circadian oscillations and subsequently identified a mutant which they named overtime (Ovtm). Using positional cloning, genetic complementation, and in-situ hybridization Takahashi and colleagues discovered that Ovtm was a point mutation that caused a loss of function in FBXL3 – an F-box protein – and was expressed throughout the brain and in the SCN. Assaying expression of known circadian clock genes in the Ovtm mutants, they observed a marked decrease in PER1 and PER2 protein and mRNA levels in the brain and a significant decrease in cry2 mRNA levels only. Takahashi and his colleagues proposed that FBXL3 is a target site for protein degradation on the CRY2 protein, which would explain relatively normal CRY2 protein levels. Negative feedback by other elements of the circadian clock could then lead to the roughly 26-hour free-running period observed in Ovtm mice.

== Awards and recognition ==
- Aschoff and Honma Prize in Biological Rhythms Research - 1986
- Ariëns Kappers Medal from the Netherlands Society for the Advancement of Sciences, Medicine, and Surgery - 1995
- W. Alden Spencer Award in Neuroscience from the Columbia University College of Physicians and Surgeons - 2001
- Gruber Prize in Neuroscience - 2019

== Notable papers ==
- Vitaterna, M.H.; King, D.P.; Chang, A.M.; Kornhauser, J.M.; Lowrey, P.L.; McDonald, J.D.; Dove, W.F.; Pinto, L.H.; Turek, F.W.; Takahashi, J.S. (1994). "Mutagenesis and mapping of a mouse gene, Clock, essential for circadian behavior". Science. 264 (5159): 719–725. Bibcode:1994Sci...264..719H. doi:10.1126/science.8171325. PMC 3839659. PMID 8171325.
- King, David; Zhao, Yaliang; Sangoram, Ashvin; Wilsbacher, Lisa; Tanaka, Monuru; Antoch, Marina; Steeves, Thomas; Vitaterna; Kornhauser; Lowrey, Phillip; Turek, Fred; Takahashi, J.S. (1997). "Positional Cloning of the Mouse Circadian Clock Gene". Cell. 89 (4): 641–653. doi:10.1016/S0092-8674(00)80245-7. PMC 3815553. PMID 9160755.
- Gekakis, Nicholas; Staknis, David; Nguyen, Hubert B.; Davis, Fred C.; Wilsbacher, Lisa D.; King, David P.; Takahashi, Joseph S.; Weitz, Charles J. (5 June 1998). "Role of the CLOCK Protein in the Mammalian Circadian Mechanism". Science. 280 (5369): 1564–1569. Bibcode:1998Sci...280.1564G. doi:10.1126/science.280.5369.1564. PMID 9616112.
- Yoo, Seung-Hee; Yamazaki, Shin; Lowrey, Phillip; Shimomura, Kazuhiro; Ko, Caroline; Buhr, Ethan; Siepka, Sandra; Hong, Hee-Kyung; et al. (February 12, 2004). "PERIOD2::LUCIFERASE real-time reporting of circadian dynamics reveals persistent circadian oscillations in mouse peripheral tissues". PNAS. 101 (15): 5339–5346. Bibcode:2004PNAS..101.5339Y. doi:10.1073/pnas.0308709101. PMC 397382. PMID 14963227.
- Ramsey KM, Yoshino J, Brace CS, Abrassart D, Kobayashi Y, Marcheva B, Hong HK, Chong JL, Buhr ED, Lee C, Takahashi JS, Imai S, Bass J (2009). "Circadian clock feedback cycle through NAMPT-mediated NAD+ biosynthesis". Science. 324 (5927): 651–4. Bibcode:2009Sci...324..651R. doi:10.1126/science.1171641. PMC 2738420. PMID 19299583. This paper discusses the circadian cycle of Clock-Bmal activating the transcription of Cry1, 2, and Per proteins which represses Clock-Bmal transcription creating daily cycling of transcription and channel activation. Specifically, Takahashi looks at NAD+ and NAMPT levels in the liver.
- J, Bass; JS, Takahashi (3 December 2010). "Circadian integration of metabolism and energetics". Science. 330 (6009): 1349–1354. Bibcode:2010Sci...330.1349B. doi:10.1126/science.1195027. PMC 3756146. PMID 21127246.
