= Achim Kramer =

German chronobiologist and biochemist

- Born: 18 May 1968 (age 58); Friedrichshafen, Germany
- Citizenship: Germany
- Education: Undergraduate: Free University of Berlin (1993); Ph.D: Humboldt University of Berlin (1996)
- Known for: Post-translational modifications of the circadian clock Circadian rhythm research
- Awards: Young Researchers Award- Charité (1998); Brooks Fellow at Harvard Medical School (2001); Heinz-Maier-Leibitz Award from German Research Foundation (2002)
- Scientific career
- Fields: Chronobiology, chronomedicine, biochemistry
- Website: Achim Kramer Lab

Achim Kramer (born May 18, 1968) is a German chronobiologist and biochemist. He is the current head of Chronobiology at Charité – Universitätsmedizin Berlin in Berlin, Germany.

Kramer's primary research interests include post-translational modifications of circadian clock proteins and the function of the circadian clock in the immune system. Some of his work includes identifying phosphorylation regions on mPER2 (mammalian PER2) and their implications for familial advanced sleep phase syndrome (FASPS), identifying circadian rhythms in macrophages, and investigating the necessity of heme degradation for circadian rhythms. Kramer's current projects include improving BodyTime (a method for identifying an individual's chronotype with a single blood sample), analyzing the coupling between peripheral circadian oscillators, and live cell imaging of circadian clock proteins. Along with being an important contributor to the field of chronobiology, he is also a certified piano teacher.

== Background ==
=== Education ===
Kramer completed his undergraduate degrees in biochemistry from Free University of Berlin in 1993 and in piano from Berlin University of the Arts in 1994. Kramer wrote his undergraduate thesis on peptide libraries used to identify tumor necrosis factor alpha (TNF-α) antagonists under the tutelage of Jens Schneider-Mergener. In 1996, Kramer completed his Ph.D summa cum laude in Biochemistry at Humboldt University of Berlin, again working under Schneider-Mergener. His dissertation research focused on identifying peptides for studying antibody-antigen interactions.

=== Academic career ===
After graduating from Humboldt University of Berlin, Kramer held several postdoctoral positions. From 1996 to 1998, he was a postdoctoral fellow at the Institute of Medical Immunology at Charité. During this time, he investigated the structural basis of cross-reactivity and polyspecificity of anti-p24 (HIV-1) antibody to attempt to better understand the mechanisms of molecular recognition events. He then was a postdoctoral fellow under Riccardo Cortese in 1998 at the Istituto di Ricerche di Biologia Molecolare (IRBM) in Rome, Italy. During this year, he learned phase-display library technology, a technique that complemented his work on cross-reactivity and polyspecificity. From 1999 through 2001, Kramer also completed a postdoctoral position at the Department of Neurobiology at Harvard Medical School under Charles Weitz, where he showed how rhythmic secretion of transforming growth factor alpha (TGF-α) by the suprachiasmatic nucleus (SCN) could encourage sleep via epidermal growth factor (EGF) signaling pathways. TGF-α binding to its epidermal growth factor receptor (EGFR) was shown to decrease locomotor activity in hamsters. Hamsters lacking EGFRs were shown to have increased activity during daytime, which indicated that TGF-α could be a possible inhibitor of locomotion.

Kramer became an Assistant Professor of Chronobiology at Charité in 2002 and has been a full tenured Professor of Chronobiology at Charité since 2007. He has also held several editorial positions. He serves as the associate editor of PLoS Genetics Journal since 2013, an Editorial Board member of the Journal of Biological Rhythms since 2013, and the editor of the Circadian Clocks: Handbook of Experimental Pharmacology. Kramer has also served on the executive board of the European Biological Rhythms Society.

== Research interests ==
Kramer's undergraduate and Ph.D research was primarily biochemistry focused. Kramer became interested in chronobiology after reading about Chuck Weitz's discovery of the partnership of BMAL1 and CLOCK. He read about Weitz's work in a Berlin newspaper, Der Tagesspiegel, and soon after applied to work as a postdoc in Weitz's lab, joining in 1999. Since then, Kramer has worked mostly in the field of chronobiology.

=== Post-translational modifications of the circadian clock ===
Kramer and his lab currently investigate how post-translational and post-transcriptional mechanisms can affect oscillations in the mammalian circadian clock. This has led his team to discover some of the underlying molecular mechanisms that could be responsible for FASPS in humans, namely a defect in PER2. They found PER2 to be less stable and more easily degraded in the cytoplasm in FASPS but could become stabilized when phosphorylated at Serine 662 (S662). Out of the 247 serine or threonine sites on PER2, Kramer and his lab were able to identify 21 of them as phosphorylation sites (including S662). Mutation of S662 to glycine (S662G) showed PER2 could export out of the nucleus more easily and get degraded in the cytoplasm, suggesting that changing phosphorylation of PER2 can prevent it from remaining in the nucleus. This finding not only led to a better understanding of the biochemical basis for the PER2 defect in FASPS, but also demonstrated how the half-lives of circadian genes can vary based on phosphorylation of proteins.

Kramer has examined the role of casein kinase 2 (CK2) in the mammalian circadian clock, specifically in its ability to phosphorylate PER2. He found that down-regulation of either CK2α or CK2β lengthened circadian period while knockdown of both CK2α and CK2β caused mice to be arrhythmic, indicating CK2 has a role in the circadian clock. Furthermore, inhibition of CK2α caused a delay in PER2 accumulation in the nucleus, suggesting that CK2α has a regulatory role in allowing PER2 to enter the nucleus.

Kramer has also investigated how CRY1 binding to PER2 can be modulated by zinc to form the CRY1:PER2 heterodimer. In 2014, his lab, in collaboration with Eva Wolf's lab, published a paper that revealed an X-ray crystal structure of CRY1:PER2 with a Zn^{2+} ion thought to be stabilizing the complex. Specifically, Kramer and his collaborators found that CRY1 had a zinc and PER2 binding site at Cysteine 414 (C414) and was unable to bind as effectively to PER2 when mutated to an alanine (C414A). The findings suggest that the Zn^{2+} ion facilitates the reduction of an intramolecular disulfide bond on CRY1 so that it can bind PER2 more effectively, which would make the circadian clock zinc sensitive.

=== Circadian clock in the immune system ===
In addition to researching post-translation modifications of clock proteins, Kramer has also studied the function of the circadian clock in the immune system. He has shown how TNF-α and IL-6 secretion by lipopolysaccharide (LPS)-stimulated murine splenic macrophages display circadian rhythms that are not dependent on either variations in glucocorticoid concentrations or the circadian changes that occur in the cellular constitution of the spleen. This exhibits how the molecular clock in immune cells can remain functional regardless of systemic cues. Kramer was also able to show that approximately 8% of the macrophage transcriptome in mice exhibits circadian oscillation, including genes (such as JUN and FOS) that are involved in LPS-induced responses.

=== Chronomedicine ===
Kramer's work has advanced sleep health and medicine. In response to Jeffrey Hall, Michael Rosbash, and Michael Young winning the 2017 Nobel Prize in Physiology or Medicine for their work on investigating the molecular mechanisms of the biological clock, Kramer noted that "Without this, we couldn't argue for later school times on evidence-based grounds; we couldn't look for the best time to take your medicine; we couldn't find an interrelation between metabolic disorders and clock disorders."

In 2018, Kramer and his colleagues developed a method to determine an individual's circadian rhythm using transcriptomics of blood monocytes taken from a single blood sample. The method identifies transcript biomarkers for internal time in the blood samples. This blood test provides information about an individual's chronotype. This personal chronotype identification method, what Kramer and colleagues call BodyTime, is currently being used to improve patients' quality of sleep. The project is ongoing, aiming to advance chronomedicine.

Along with optimizing the BodyTime project, Kramer is currently investigating coupling between peripheral circadian oscillators and is working on live cell imaging of circadian clock proteins.

=== Summary of selected publications ===
- 2001 – Identified transforming growth factor-alpha (TGF-α) as an inhibitor of locomotion via the suprachiasmatic nucleus (SCN) and epidermal growth factor (EGF) receptors
- 2006 – Identified phosphorylation regions of mPER2 that stabilized it or led to its degradation, explaining the phenotype of familial advanced sleep phase syndrome(FASPS)
- 2009 – Discovered the protein casein kinase 2 (CK2) as being an important component in the cellular clock as a phosphorylating agent of PER2
- 2009 – Found that spleen, lymph node, and peritoneal macrophages exhibit circadian rhythms in and ex vivo in mice, impacting the oscillations of the immune system
- 2014 – Discovered a zinc ion on the mCRY1-mPER2 dimer and suggested importance of zinc and disulfide bond formation to the interaction of the two clock proteins
- 2017 – Showed that heme degradation is necessary for circadian rhythms through its generation of carbon monoxide (CO). CO lessens the CLOCK-BMAL1 binding to target promoters
- 2018 – Created a method for determining internal circadian time for individuals using a single blood sample

== Honors and awards ==
- 1998: Young Researchers Award- Charité
- 2001: Brooks Fellow at Harvard Medical School
- 2002: Heinz-Maier-Leibitz Award from German Research Foundation (DFG)
- 2010, 2011, 2013, 2015: Teaching Awards of the Charité Master Program in Medical Neurosciences
