= Martin R. Ralph =

American circadian biologist

- Education: Stanford University (B.A.); University of Oregon University of Virginia
- Scientific career
- Fields: Biology, Psychology
- Doctoral advisor: Michael Menaker

Martin R. Ralph is a circadian biologist who serves as a professor in the Psychology Department at the University of Toronto. His research primarily focuses on circadian rhythmicity in the fields of neuroscience, psychology, and endocrinology. His most notable work has been on the suprachiasmatic nucleus, now recognized as the central circadian pacemaker in mammals, but has also investigated circadian rhythms in the context of time, memory, and light.

== Early education ==
Martin Ralph attended Stanford University from 1972 to 1976 where he earned his Bachelor's Degree in Biology. He then received his Doctorate while attending the University of Oregon from 1982 to 1986. After earning his Ph.D, he stayed and worked under circadian biologist Dr. Michael Menaker at the University of Virginia where he most notably helped discover the tau mutation in golden hamsters. In 1998, he joined the University of Toronto as a Professor of Psychology.

== Scientific contributions ==
=== Discovery and genetic basis of the tau mutant hamster ===
While working as a grad student under Dr. Michael Menaker, one of the modern grandfathers of circadian biology, he discovered a golden hamster that had a period noticeably less than 24 hours. The motor activity rhythms of Golden hamsters typically follow periods of 24 hours, with little variation. After further breeding these mutant hamsters, he noticed that homozygous mutants had a 20 hour period of daily activity rhythms and heterozygous mutants had a 22 hours period. In circadian biology, tau (τ), denoted the duration of a rhythm in an organism, so a circadian rhythm has a tau value near 24 hours. Given the differences in period, he decided to name this mutant strain the "tau hamster." This hamster was the first evidence of a genetic basis to circadian rhythms in mammals, and it has been used as a model to further study the genetic basis of circadian rhythmicity and the rhythmicity in specific proteins and behaviors besides locomotion such as body size and melatonin expression.

He later worked with a team of circadian biologists led by Dr. Joseph Takahashi to identify the location of the mutation responsible for tau mutant hamster's 20 hour period. They used genetically directed representational difference analysis (GDRDA), an assay used to connect genetic mutations to a specific trait, to discern the genetic differences between the mutant and wild-type hamsters. They localized the area of genetic differences to chromosome 22 in the region encoding the casein kinase 1 epsilon (CK1ε) gene. They showed that CK1ε interacts with the PERIOD gene, which has been established as a mammalian circadian gene, and this activity was decreased in the mutant version of CK1ε, presenting an explanation for the behavior of the tau mutant hamster.

=== Identification of the suprachiasmatic nucleus as a circadian pacemaker ===
One of the first uses of the mutant (tau) golden hamster was the identification of the suprachiasmatic nucleus (SCN) as an important pacemaker of locomotive daily rhythms. When the SCN was ablated in wild-type hamsters, they lost rhythmic locomotor activity. They then transplanted a new SCN from a donor hamster and observed restored rhythmicity in the receiving hamster with the same period as the donor hamster. If the donor was wild-type, they observed a 24 hour period, and if the donor was homozygous mutant, they observed a 20 hour period. This experiment proved both the necessity and sufficiency of the SCN to generate daily sleep-wake rhythms in these hamsters. Circadian researchers continued to study the SCN, and this structure is now recognized as the primary circadian pacemaker in mammals.

=== Determining the impact of masking by light ===
Some of Dr. Ralph's most cited work includes his contributions that showed masking by light. Masking refers to the ability for external cues such as the light that can influence animal behavior by being integrated into the circadian rhythm. As the animal continues to have its innate biological clock, other exogenous cues are factored in that enable the animal to respond right away to environmental changes. For example, having a pulse of light during a diurnal animal's rest phase could lead to a change in period and rhythmicity, even for some time after the short stimulus. In his work done with Dr. Gary Pickard in the Menaker lab, Dr. Ralph studied mice which had their intergeniculate leaflet (IGL), a retinal pathway important for perceiving light, surgically removed.

Overall, they found that lesioned mice had increased phase delays and were less responsive to phase shifts due to light pulses. Additionally, the active period of the mice did not lengthen with constant light conditions. These data suggested that the IGL likely played a major role in feeding light information back to the suprachiasmatic nucleus. Later experiments done with the golden hamster added to these results and suggested that the circadian response is dependent on the "environmental situation" at which the light is given.

=== GABA regulation on light-dependent responses ===
While working in the Menaker lab, Ralph also investigated GABA regulation of circadian responses to light. They found that the GABA antagonist bicuculline blocks phase delays and the benzodiazepine diazepam (a potentiator of GABA activity) blocks phase advances in golden hamsters exposed to light. The bicuculline-induced blockade of phase delays was decreased by activators of GABA activity, while the diazepam-induced blockade of phase advances could be decreased by competitive and noncompetitive antagonists of GABA. These findings suggest that the GABA-benzodiazepine receptor-ionophore complex is likely the site of action for the circadian alterations of these drugs. Interestingly, they found that other GABA agonists and antagonists did not produce the same blocking of phase advances and phase delays that diazepam and bicuculline did, respectively, suggesting an alternative mechanism other than changes in chloride conductance.

=== Circadian effects on learning and memory ===
Another area of Dr. Ralph's research is on the circadian rhythm's effect on learning. Working on mice, Dr. Ralph and other researchers found that the timing of an important event is encoded by a condition entrainable oscillator that is set by an acute change in dopamine transmission at the time of the event, allowing animals to learn and remember the time of day that significant conditions occur and anticipate recurrence at 24 hour intervals. Dr. Ralph has also found that circadian modulation of conditioned place avoidance in hamsters does not require the SCN (suprachiasmatic nucleus), suggesting that memory for time of day may require a circadian oscillator separate from the SCN.

=== Circadian effects on longevity ===
Another area of Martin's research focuses on the impact of circadian rhythm disruption on longevity. While the functional role of circadian rhythms had been well established, little was known about the adaptiveness of daily oscillations in physiology and behavior in organisms. He found that the tau mutant hamster had significantly reduced lifespans compared to wild-type and homozygous tau mutant hamsters. Transplanting fetal brain grafts with SCN reversed the decline in behavioral rhythmicity naturally associated with age and extended longevity by 20% in adult hamsters. In fact, 11 of the hamsters that received SCN grafting outlived 50% of all controls, with grafting of other brain tissue types resulting in similar life expectancy as controls. These findings suggest that clock speed slows down with age and decreased behavioral rhythms (measured as running time) are highly predictive of lifespan within a few weeks.

=== Other neural transplantation experiments ===
Ralph's SCN transplantation study not only showed the role of the SCN, but it also showed the ability of a neural transplant to restore lost function. This same procedure is being explored as a treatment for neurodegenerative diseases. A study conducted in 2020 explored whether the transplantation of functional tissue from induced-pluripotent stem cells could restore function for a patient suffering from Parkinson's disease. After confirming that the graft successfully survived, they found that over the course of two years the patient's symptoms improved or remained constant. It is worth mentioning that this was only conducted in one patient. A recent meta-analysis (2022) of neural transplantation studies showed that replacing dopamine-producing cells with stem-cell derived equivalents is not only safe for patients but can improve motor function and daily living ability. Another study similar to Dr. Ralph's work includes work done in 2014 which showed that transplantation of interneurons led to the restoration of memory and cognitive function in an Alzheimer's disease mouse model In particular, the transplantation of inhibitory interneurons shed light on the role inhibition plays in generating normal function through interplay with excitatory neurons.

=== Current work ===
Ralph continued his interest in circadian research at the University of Toronto, specifically in smaller mammalian models of mice and hamsters. His lab investigates the behavior of proteins that regulate and exhibit circadian rhythms and how both zeitgebers and protein mutations affect their expression and animal behavior. He has studied these topics primarily in the fields of neuroscience and psychology. Most recently, his lab studied how circadian proteins are modulated for specific memory tasks independent of the overall circadian clock. They observed that implicit time-memory, an unconscious memory of a specific time that can be anticipated during which a significant event repeatedly occurs, modulates PER2 mRNA expression only in the striatum of the brain and without affecting the overall circadian clock. This research provides evidence to begin answering the question of where time memory anatomically is located in the brain, which is currently unknown.

== Honors and awards ==
Member of the Society for Research on Biological Rhythms since 1988.

A.P. Sloan Foundation Research Fellowship in October 1991

Member of the Canadian Society for Chronobiology since 2013.

Board Member of the European Biological Rhythms Society since 2011
