= Actogram =

Graphical representation

An actogram is a plot that shows rhythms in biological variables throughout the day. Traditionally, actograms describe phases of activity and rest, but they have also been used to visualize rhythms in protein phosphorylation, gene expression, and hormone secretion. Actograms are commonly used to study the underlying circadian rhythms of animals in fields such as ecology, reproductive biology, and sleep medicine.

== History ==
One of the first examples of actograms being used in circadian biology was by Maynard Johnson. Johnson compared the daily rhythms of different species of mice. One of the benefits noted about the actogram as a representation of animal activity was that it was easy to see rhythms in activity.

An early criticism of actograms was that the level of activity of the test subject could not be seen in an actogram. This was because the Esterline-Angus chart recorders that were used could not give a reliable measure of the amplitude of activity.

In the 1960s, Colin Pittendrigh was one of the first biologists to use a double-plotted actogram. Pittendrigh used double-plotted actograms when exploring the "after-effects". The benefit to the double-plotted actogram was that Pittendrigh was able to notice rhythms that extended beyond 24 hours and the existence of two oscillators within organisms.

== Graph interpretation ==
Actograms typically have a bar above the graph that indicates the lighting conditions that the subject was exposed to. Dark bars indicate periods of total darkness, and white bars indicate periods of light.

On the graph itself, the x-axis indicates the time of day, typically in 24-hour cycles. The y-axis indicates the days of the experiment. The graph either plots periods of activity or of rest, as specified by the author.

If periods of activity and rest align with the lighting conditions, then the subject is assumed to be entrained to those conditions. If there is a clear rhythm in activity that does not correspond to lighting conditions, or exists in constant darkness, the subject is said to be free-running. In free-running actograms, the period of activity is typically offset each day from the previous day, due to the fact that biological clocks rarely follow an exactly 24-hour cycle. If data points shift to the left, the subject is running on a cycle less than 24 hours. If they shift to the right, it is running on a greater than 24-hour cycle. If the graph shows arrhythmicity with no clear pattern, then the subject may not have a functioning internal biological clock or may have a disruption in the clock's output.

=== Double-plotted actogram ===
While actograms typically plot one 24-hour cycle at a time, double-plotted actograms plot two 24-hour cycles side by side. Double-plotted actograms are interpreted in the same way as single-plotted actograms. However, double-plotted graphs can make it easier to read and interpret data, especially from free-running organisms.

== Phase response curves derived from actograms ==
A common way that actograms are utilized in chronobiology is by translating the actogram's data into phase response curves (PRCs). PRCs are a way of showing the actogram's phase shifts in line graph form, shifting focus from activity and rest onset to a possible range of entrainment of the organism. An actogram's period shows an organism's activity rhythm in light or dark conditions. An organism's phase can be influenced by external stimuli, either causing an advance or delay in their period or not affecting it. These period changes are called phase shifts and are the main focus of PRCs. The y-axis of the PRC is the phase shift in hours, and the x-axis is circadian time in hours.

The PRC has three zones: the dead zone, the delay zone, and the advance zone. The dead zone is the portion of the graph that shows how, after an external stimulus, there is no phase shift seen in the actogram's data and the line approaches y equals zero. The delay zone is the section of the PRC that correlates to a delay in the period on the actogram, illustrated as negative y values. Reversely, the advance zone correlates to advances in the period on the actogram, illustrated as positive y values.
