= Fred W. Turek =

American sleep scientist

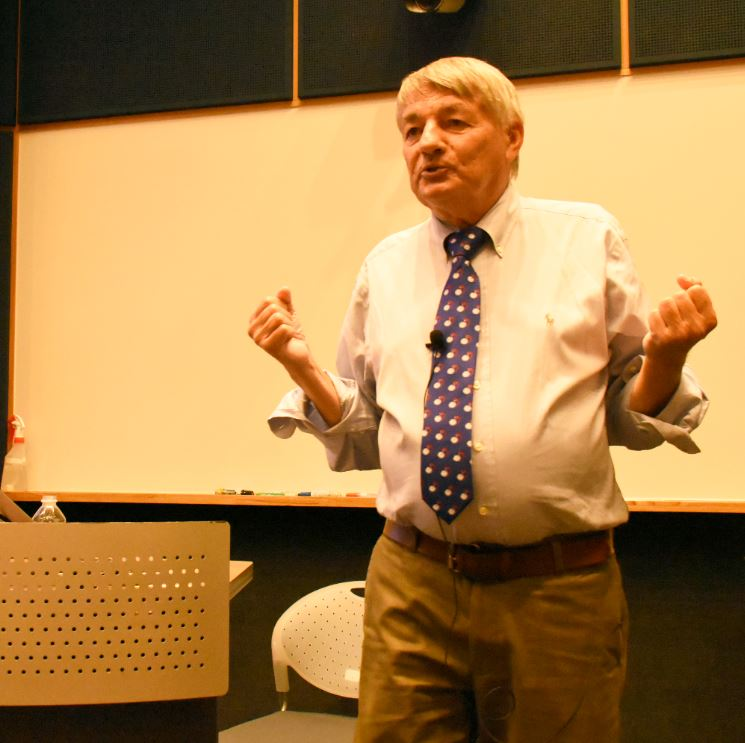
- Born: July 31, 1947 (age 79)
- Citizenship: United States
- Education: Stanford University
- Awards: Guggenheim Fellowship (1991); Distinguished Scientist Award, Sleep Research Society (2011); Directors' Award for Research & Service, SRBR (2022)
- Scientific career
- Fields: Neurobiology, Sleep, Circadian Rhythms
- Workplaces: Northwestern University; University of Texas
- Website: https://cscb.northwestern.edu/

Fred W. Turek is the director of the Center for Sleep & Circadian Biology and the Charles E. & Emma H. Morrison Professor of Biology in the Department of Neurobiology, both at Northwestern University. Turek received his Ph.D. from Stanford University. He was awarded a Guggenheim Fellowship in 1991.

== Background ==
Turek graduated from Stanford University, in Stanford, California, in 1973, receiving a PhD in biological sciences; he then completed a two-year postdoctoral fellowship at the University of Texas, where he studied in the Department of Zoology from 1973 to 1975.

He started working as an assistant professor at Northwestern University in 1975, where he still works to this day, serving as the Director of the Center for Sleep & Circadian Biology and as the Charles & Emma Morrison Professor of Biology in the Department of Neurobiology.

== Research ==
Presently, Turek's research interests revolve around the genetic, molecular, and neural basis for sleep and circadian rhythms. He focuses most of his attention on the role of sleep and circadian clock systems for energy balance, obesity, premature birth, gastrointestinal function, and depression specifically. The Turek laboratory investigates cellular events involved in the entrainment, generation, and expression of circadian rhythms arising from a biological clock located in the suprachiasmatic nucleus of the hypothalamus; the genetics of the circadian clock system; the molecular genetic mechanisms underlying the sleep-wake cycle; the effects of advanced age on the expression of behavioral and endocrine rhythms and on the expression of circadian clock genes; the links between sleep, circadian rhythms, and energy metabolism; the role of melatonin in sleep and circadian rhythms; and other topics regarding sleep and circadian rhythms.

Turek's lab spends much of their time working on rodents, but they have also established working relationships with academic researchers. Studies in humans are aimed at shifting the human clock in an attempt to alleviate mental and physical problems that are associated with disorders in circadian time-keeping. Their sleep, circadian, and metabolic studies are focused on how disruption in these functions can lead to obesity, diabetes, and cardiovascular disease.

=== Center for Sleep & Circadian Biology ===
Since 1995, Turek has served as the Director of Northwestern University's Center for Sleep & Circadian Biology (CSCB). The CSCB is a University Research Center, within the Department of Neurobiology, that integrates research on sleep and circadian rhythms into a unified program.

== Organizations ==
Since 1981 Turek has been a member of the American Association for the Advancement of Science. He has also served in roles for the Sleep Research Society: he was chair of their Government Relations Committee from 2009-2011, and was a member of the SRS National Institute of Health Liaison Group and the SRS Congressional Liaison Group.

He also served on the boards of the National Institute of Health National Center on Sleep Disorders Research and the National Sleep Foundation.

Turek was also the founder of Society for Research on Biological Rhythms (SRBR), where he also served as President from 1987 to 1992. He is still a member of the SRBR.

He is a deputy editor of the journal SLEEP, was editor in chief of the Journal of Biological Rhythms from 1995 to 2000, and has been the Section Editor for “Genetics of Sleep” and “Chronobiology” for the 2010, 2016, and 2017 editions of Principles and Practices of Sleep Medicine.

== Publications ==
Turek has published nearly 400 reviews and peer-reviewed papers in his nearly 40 years of professorship.

== Professional Recognition ==
Directors' Award for Research and Service, Society for Research on Biological Rhythms (2022)
Distinguished Service Award, Sleep Research Society (2011)
Distinguished Scientist Award, Sleep Research Society (2011)
Government Relations Committee Chair, Sleep Research Society (2009)
Pioneer Award, Institute for Women's Health Research, Northwestern University (2008)
Board of Trustees, Universities Space Research Association (2001)
Board of Directors, National Sleep Foundation (NSF) (2000)
Distinguished Senior Investigator Award, National Alliance for Research on Schizophrenia and Depression (NARSAD) (1998)
Endowed Chair Charles E. and Emma H. Morrison Professor of Biology, Northwestern University (1995)
Guggenheim Fellowship, John Simon Guggenheim Memorial Foundation (1991)
Senior Fellowship, Belgian American Educational Foundation (BAEF) (1991)
Senior International Fellowship, NIH Fogarty International Center (1991)
Curt P. Richter Prize, International Society of Psychoneuroendocrinology (1987)
Senior International Fellowship, NIH Fogarty International Center (1986)
Award from the Underwood Fund, Agricultural Research Council (1981)
Elected a Fellow, American Association for the Advancement of Science (AAAS) (1981)
Associated Student Government Faculty Honor Roll, Northwestern University (1980)
Research Career Development Award, National Institutes of Health (NIH) (1978)
