= Horacio de la Iglesia =

Argentinean researcher in chronobiology

Dr. Horacio de la Iglesia is an Argentinean researcher in chronobiology and professor of biology at the University of Washington. After his formal education, he started the De La Iglesia Lab, at the University of Washington to conduct research on how neural systems encode time and generate rhythmic physiological and behavioral outputs to adapt to the environment. His most impactful research has contributed to the knowledge of sleep in adolescents and unhoused individuals.

== Early life and education ==
Horacio de la Iglesia developed an interest for animal behavior biology during his time as an undergraduate student at the University of Buenos Aires (UBA) in Argentina after observing the burrowing patterns of the South American Fiddler Crab. He took courses in ecology and molecular biology, completing a research-intensive biology track. Under the guidance of faculty mentors at UBA, de la Iglesia studied how tides influenced the behavior and daily rhythms of South American Fiddler Crabs

After completing his undergraduate studies at UBA, de la Iglesia moved to the US to pursue a PhD in Neuroscience and Behavior at the University of Massachusetts at Amherst (UMass). At UMass at Amherst, de la Iglesia studied under Eric L. Bittman as an advisor. His thesis work aimed to understand the neuroanatomy of the master circadian clock of mammals – the suprachiasmatic nucleus (SCN) — and the brain centers that control reproduction.

During a post-doctural fellowship at the University of Massachusetts Chan Medical School (1998–2003), he continued his studies of the SCN, demonstrating the functional dissection of reconfigured SCN subdivisions by exposure to exotic lighting cycles. During this time, William J Schwartz served as his advisor.

When de la Iglesia joined the University of Washington Department of Biology in 2003, he continued work on the functional anatomy of the SCN before reframing his research to focus on the physiological and behavioral impact of sleep on humans.

== Career ==
=== Sleep in adolescents ===
While at the University of Washington, de la Iglesia conducted research on teenagers in middle schools and high schools in Seattle, finding that only 2 out of the 282 participating adolescents got the 9 hours of sleep thought to be optimal for this age group. De la Iglesia used his work to advocate for a change in Seattle public school start times. Public schools in the area shifted their schedules back one hour for the 2016–2017 school year; after studying students before and after this schedule change, de la Iglesia reported an average 34-minute increase in sleep (considered a significant increase in the field of chronobiology) for students, as well as a general improvement in academic performance and a decrease in absences.

=== Sleep and homelessness ===
De la Iglesia, alongside graduate student researcher Alicia Rice, started "The Sleep and Homelessness Project" in 2019 through the De la Iglesia Lab at the University of Washington. This project sought to investigate the relationship between chronic homelessness, sleep quality, and health outcomes in the homeless population of Seattle, WA. De la Iglesia and his team used actigraphy to measure the sleep cycles of their participants. They also conducted interviews with said participants, giving them an opportunity to voice how permanent homelessness has affected their sleep quality and subsequent wellbeing.

=== Sleep cycle synchronization to lunar cycles ===
In 2021, de la Iglesia and a team of researchers from the University of Washington, the National University of Quilmes in Argentina, and Yale University published research regarding how lunar cycles affect human sleep patterns. In both cities like Seattle, WA and indigenous areas like the Toba-Qom communities in northern Argentina, they showed that people's sleep cycles oscillate with the 29.5-day lunar cycle. De la Iglesia and his team also found that several days before a full moon, people go to sleep later in the night and generally sleep for a short amount of time.

== Positions and achievements ==
Horacio de la Iglesia is currently a professor of biology at the University of Washington and an affiliate professor in the Program of Neuroscience. De la Iglesia is also president of the Society for Research on Biological Rhythms, an organization dedicated to promoting research on circadian rhythms. In recognition of his research and teaching, de la Iglesia has received several honors, including the Outstanding Mentor Award from the University of Washington Graduate School in 2012.

== Selected publications ==
- (2000) Science. "Antiphase oscillation of the left and right suprachiasmatic nuclei.”
- (2004) Current Biology. "Forced Desynchronization of Dual Circadian Oscillators within the Rat Suprachiasmatic Nucleus.”
- (2006) Endocrinology. "Minireview: Timely Ovulation: Circadian Regulation of the Female Hypothalamo-Pituitary-Gonadal Axis.”
- (2010) Frontiers In Bioscience (Elite Edition). “Biological clocks and rhythms in intertidal crustaceans."
- (2013) Proceedings of the Royal Society B: Biological Sciences. “Chronobiology by Moonlight.”
- (2013) Current Biology. “Biological clocks: riding the tides.”
- (2015) Journal of Biological Rhythms. “Access to Electric Light Is Associated with Shorter Sleep Duration in a Traditionally Hunter-Gatherer Community.”
- (2018) Science – Science Advances. “Sleepmore in Seattle: Later school start times are associated with more sleep and better performance in high school students.”
- (2022) The Conversation: “School start times and screen time late in the evening exacerbate sleep deprivation in US teenagers.”
- (2022) Methods in Molecular Biology. “Sleep Under Preindustrial Conditions: What We Can Learn from It.”
