= William J. Schwartz =

American neurologist and scientist (born 1950)

William Joseph Schwartz
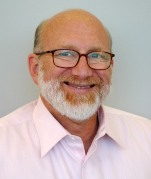
- Born: March 28, 1950 (age 75); Philadelphia, U.S.
- Education: University of Southern California; University of California, Irvine (BS); University of California, San Francisco (MD)
- Scientific career
- Institutions: Harvard Medical School; University of Massachusetts Medical School; Dell Medical School

William Joseph Schwartz (born March 28, 1950) is an American neurologist and scientist who serves as Professor and Associate Chair for Research and Education in the neurology department at the University of Texas Dell Medical School. His work on the neurobiology of circadian timekeeping has focused on the mammalian suprachiasmatic nucleus. Schwartz demonstrated that the suprachiasmatic nucleus is rhythmic in vivo using a 2-deoxyglucose radioactive marker for functional brain imaging. As of 2014, he is editor of the Journal of Biological Rhythms.

== Early life and education ==
Schwartz was born on March 28, 1950, in Philadelphia, Pennsylvania. In 1959, he moved to southern California with his family. He began his undergraduate education at the University of Southern California in Los Angeles and, in 1971, finished his Bachelor of Science degree in biological sciences at the University of California, Irvine. He completed his M.D. in 1974 and a medical internship from 1974 to 1975 both at the University of California, San Francisco. From 1975–1978, Schwartz did a research fellowship at the National Institute of Mental Health. He finished his neurology residency training (1978–1981) at the University of California, San Francisco.

== Career and appointments ==
Following his residency training, Schwartz joined the faculties of Harvard Medical School and the Massachusetts General Hospital between 1981 and 1986. Schwartz then moved to the University of Massachusetts Medical School, where he held dual positions in the Neurology Department at the School of Medicine, and in the Neuroscience Department at the Graduate School of Biomedical Sciences.

Schwartz has held visiting fellowships at several universities including but not limited to the Leiden University Medical Center (2005) , Rijksuniversiteit Groningen, University of Auckland (2012), and Washington University in St. Louis (2016).

As of 2017, Schwartz is the Associate Chair of Research and Education Neurology at the Dell Medical School.

Schwartz serves as the editor-in-chief of the Journal of Biological Rhythms from 2014–present, and was previously elected as the Chair of the Gordon Research Conference on Chronobiology (1993) and President of the Society for Research on Biological Rhythms (2004–2006).

== Research and publications ==
=== Discovery of suprachiasmatic nucleus as an endogenous clock ===
In 1977, Schwartz, along with Harold Gainer, Ph.D, found that the glucose consumption in the rat suprachiasmatic nucleus is a function of time of day and environmental lighting conditions.

Glucose consumption was studied via a technique using ^{14}C-deoxyglucose (DG). DG is transported into the brain via the same mechanism which transports glucose, where it is then phosphorylated by hexokinase into ^{14}C-deoxyglucose-6-phosphate(DG-6-P). The accumulation of DG-6-P reflects the rate of glucose consumption, and can be quantitatively measured using an autoradiograph. This method can be used to visualize activity in different regions of the brain. Schwartz's work with this method contributed to its early utilization and application, demonstrating that the method primarily measures energy demands of the synaptic, rather than the spiking, activities of neural tissue. This insight has been key to the interpretation of modern brain mapping methods, including 18 F-DG PET scanning and the BOLD signal of functional MRI.

In Schwartz's and Gainer's study of suprachiasmatic nucleus glucose consumption, the suprachiasmatic nucleus was found to have higher glucose consumption during the daytime than during the night. This rhythm of activation was present both with and without environmental light exposure, providing the first evidence for the suprachiasmatic nucleus as an endogenous circadian clock. This research was pivotal in confirming circadian rhythm regulation by the suprachiasmatic nucleus, and aided new techniques to study neural mechanisms.

=== Light regulation of Fos-related protein in the rat suprachiasmatic nucleus ===
In 1990, Schwartz et al. began the process of investigating the mechanism of the circadian clock in the suprachiasmatic nucleus by looking at c-Fos, considered the first known suprachiasmatic nucleus clock gene. In order to begin determining the molecular processes that lead to photic entrainment, Schwartz and others analyzed the photic and temporal regulation of the suprachiasmatic nucleus-localized transcriptional regulatory protein c-Fos. They found in albino rats that Fos has altered immunoreactive levels in a phase-dependent manner when exposed to light. This makes Fos a good functional marker for the cellular effects of light, and indicates that it may be a part of the mechanism involved in the photo-entrainment of light. This work contributed to establishing suprachiasmatic nucleus c-Fos as the first photoinducible molecular marker and was critical in the process of determining the necessary substrates of the photic entrainment pathway in mammals.

=== Current studies ===
The Schwartz research group focused on understanding the neural regulation of circadian rhythmicity in mammals. They focused on tissue, organismal, and supra-organismal levels of analysis to see how individual processes interact in the circadian system to produce observable emergent properties. The Schwartz lab investigated light induced and endogenous gene expression, and the underlying dual oscillatory structure of the circadian pacemaker. His research group has focused on defining the mechanisms by which dysrhythmias occur and how social interactions may impact circuits and cells in the master clock.

Schwartz has also researched the effect of social forces on circadian rhythms. His research, conducted with Matthew J. Paul ad Premananda Indic suggests that cohabitation affects the onset of rhythmicity in hamsters, and that changing the speed of the circadian clock is one mechanism by which social factors could alter daily rhythms. In a 2013 paper co-authored with Guy Bloch, Erik D. Herzog and Joel D. Levine, Schwartz shows that social cues may be critical to the adaptive function of circadian rhythms, and can affect them from colony, to organismal, to cellular levels.

As of 2017, Schwartz is not running a research lab as he is helping with education at Dell Medical School at the University of Texas at Austin.

== Personal life ==
As of 2017, Schwartz resides in Austin with his wife, Randi Eisner. The couple have two children.

=== Selected publications ===
1. Schwartz WJ, Gainer H. "Suprachiasmatic nucleus: use of 14C-labeled deoxyglucose uptake as a functional marker." Science. 1977; 197: 1089–1091.
2. Schwartz WJ, Smith CB, Davidsen L, Savaki H, Sokoloff L, Mata M, Fink DJ, Gainer H. Metabolic mapping of functional activity in the hypothalamo-neurohypophyseal system of the rat. Science. 1979; 205: 723–725.
3. Reppert SM, Schwartz WJ. Maternal coordination of the fetal biological clock in utero. Science. 1983; 220: 969–971.
4. Schwartz WJ, Gross RA, Morton MT. The suprachiasmatic nuclei contain a tetrodotoxin-resistant circadian pacemaker. Proc Natl Acad Sci USA. 1987; 84: 1694–1698.
5. Schwartz WJ, Zimmerman P. Circadian timekeeping in BALB/c and C57BL/6 inbred mouse strains. J Neurosci. 1990; 10: 3685–3694.
6. Aronin N, Sagar SM, Sharp FR, Schwartz WJ. Light regulates expression of a Fos-related protein in rat suprachiasmatic nuclei. Proc Natl Acad Sci USA. 1990; 87: 5959–5962.
7. Takeuchi J, Shannon W, Aronin N, Schwartz WJ. Compositional changes of AP-1 DNA-binding proteins are regulated by light in a mammalian circadian clock. Neuron. 1993; 11: 825–836.
8. Sumová A, Trávnícková Z, Peters R, Schwartz WJ, Illnerová H. The rat suprachiasmatic nucleus is a clock for all seasons. Proc Natl Acad Sci USA. 1995; 92: 7754–7758.
9. de la Iglesia HO, Meyer J, Carpino A Jr, Schwartz WJ. Antiphase oscillation of the left and right suprachiasmatic nuclei. Science. 2000; 290: 799–801.
10. Jagota A, de la Iglesia HO, Schwartz WJ. Morning and evening circadian oscillations revealed in the suprachiasmatic nucleus in vitro. Nature Neuroscience. 2000; 3: 372–376.
11. de la Iglesia HO, Cambras T, Schwartz WJ, Díez-Noguera A. Forced desynchronization of dual circadian oscillators within the rat suprachiasmatic nucleus. Current Biology. 2004; 14: 796–800.

=== Fellowships and chairs ===
- 1987: Elected Member of the American Neurological Association
- 2005: Boerhaave Visiting Professor, Leiden University Medical Centre, Netherlands
- 2008: Baerends Visiting Chair, University of Groningen, Netherlands
- 2012: Hood Fellow, University of Auckland, New Zealand
- 2014: Visiting Fellow, Center for Advanced Studies, LMU Munich, Germany
- 2015: Visiting Fellow, Japan Society for the Promotion of Science, Kyoto University, Japan
- 2016: Nirit and Michael Shaoul Fellow, Tel Aviv University, Israel
- 2016: Clark Way Harrison Visiting Professor, Washington University in St. Louis, USA
