= Michael Menaker =

American chronobiologist (1934–2021)

- Born: May 19, 1934; Austria
- Died: February 14, 2021 (aged 86); Virginia, U.S.
- Education: Swarthmore College (BA); Princeton University (PhD)
- Scientific career
- Fields: Biology
- Doctoral advisor: Colin Pittendrigh

Michael Menaker (May 19, 1934 – February 14, 2021) was an American chronobiologist who was Commonwealth Professor of Biology at University of Virginia. His research focused on circadian rhythmicity of vertebrates, including contributing to an understanding of light input pathways on extra-retinal photoreceptors of non-mammalian vertebrates, discovering a mammalian mutation for circadian rhythmicity (tau mutation in golden hamsters), and locating a circadian oscillator in the pineal gland of bird. He wrote almost 200 scientific publications.

== Early life and education ==
Menaker grew up in New York City. After graduating from Swarthmore College in 1955 with a B.A. in biology, Menaker went on to Princeton University. In the lab of Colin Pittendrigh, the father of research on biological clocks, Menaker studied the endogenous circadian rhythm of bats (Myotis lucifugus).

He graduated from Princeton University with a Ph.D. in 1960, and continued postdoctoral studies in Donald Griffin's lab at Harvard University. As he continued to study bats, his interest shifted from circadian rhythms to hibernation patterns. When Menaker joined faculty at University of Texas at Austin in 1962, he transitioned to studying circadian rhythms in the house sparrow (Passer domesticus) and the golden hamster (Mesocricetus auratus).

== Academic career ==
Menaker held academic positions at the University of Texas, University of Oregon, and more recently, at University of Virginia, where he was the Commonwealth Professor of Biology from 1987 to 2020. He served as Chairman of the Biology Department at Virginia from 1987 to 1993. He mentored several experts in the field of chronobiology, including Joseph Takahashi, Chair of the Neuroscience Department at University of Texas Southwestern Medical Center; Heidi Hamm, Chair of the Pharmacology Department at Vanderbilt University; and Carl Johnson, Professor of Biological Sciences at Vanderbilt University. He authored almost 200 papers and maintained grant funding to support his research for over 60 years.

== Scientific work ==
=== Discovery of extra-retinal photoreceptor(s) in the house sparrow ===
In 1968, Menaker provided evidence for the existence of extra-retinal photoreceptors that were sufficient for photoentrainment by measuring rhythmic locomotor behavior as the output signal of the house sparrows (Passer domesticus) circadian clock. He demonstrated that photoentrainment could occur in the absence of optic neurons, evidence for the presence of an extra-retinal photoreceptor(s) coupled to the House Sparrow circadian clock. In this experiment, bilaterally enucleated house sparrows were exposed to an artificial light-dark cycle. They were kept in constant darkness to determine their free-running period and subsequently allowed to entrain to light cues. Locomotor activity was recorded through observing perching behavior of the sparrows. He tested three possible confounding variables for entrainment: (1) temperature fluctuation, (2) post-enucleation retinal fragments remaining in the eye, and (3) ectoparasites that might transfer light information through their movements in the birds' skin. To study the effects of temperature on circadian rhythms, Menaker exposed the enucleated sparrows to an electroluminescent panel. Menaker treated sparrows with Dry-Die, an anti-parasitic agent, to eliminate any possible effects of light transferring by ectoparasites. Since the sparrows did not entrain during tests of temperature fluctuation and the sparrows remained entrained 10 months after enucleation, a point at which any excess of the functional retina would have degraded, Menaker ruled out these possible confounding variables. Menaker's lab concluded the sparrows were able to entrain to environmental light cues. These results demonstrate that retinal light receptors are not necessary for photoentrainment, indicating there is an extra-retinal photoreceptor(s) contributing to circadian locomotor activity. Menaker's findings in enucleated sparrows were consistent with Aschoff's Rule, and he concluded that the retinae and the extra-retinal receptor(s) both contribute to the photoentrainment process.

=== Pineal gland as a location for circadian oscillator in the house sparrow ===
In 1979, Menaker and Natille Headrick Zimmerman expanded on Menaker's previous work with house sparrows, by exploring the influence of the pineal gland and hypothalamus on circadian rhythms. They transplanted the pineal tissue of one sparrow into the anterior chamber of the eyes of an arrhythmic, pinealectomized sparrow. Prior to the transplantation procedure, the donor birds were entrained to a 12:12 light:dark photoperiod cycle. This allowed them to compare the onset of activity, measured by perching patterns, of the donors before pineal transplantation and the recipients after transplantation. Upon receiving pineal tissue transplantation, previously arrhythmic sparrows experienced the reestablishment of rhythmicity. In fact, their reestablished circadian oscillations resembled the circadian oscillation pattern for locomotor activity of the donor sparrows. The 20% of the sparrows who had successful transplantations showed temporary arrhythmicity in constant darkness for a period of 10 to 100 days, which was not always evenly distributed in the 24-hour day; the sparrows, however, eventually became rhythmic once again. Menaker concluded the pineal gland is a driving oscillator within a multi-component system.

=== Discovery of the tau mutation in golden hamsters ===
In 1988, Martin Ralph and Menaker serendipitously came across a tau mutant male golden hamster in a shipment from their commercial supplier, Charles River Laboratories, that was observed to have a circadian period significantly shorter than what is characteristic of that breed. These golden hamsters are recognized for their narrow range of periods with a typical mean of 24 hours. Thus, rather than overlooking this abnormal male hamster, Menaker conducted breeding experiments to produce homozygous tau mutants with a period of 20 hours and heterozygous tau mutants with a period of 22 hours. The pattern of inheritance from this shortened tau indicated the genetic cause of this phenotype was isolated to a single allele, providing a genetic approach to the determination of the biological mechanism. This accidental forward genetic screen yielded the first specimen that could be studied for genetic insight into mammalian circadian mechanisms.

The first major finding with this strain was that the oscillator had to be located in the suprachiasmatic nucleus (SCN). To test this conclusion, Menaker and colleagues conducted experiments whereby the SCN from a tau mutant hamster was transplanted through a neural graft to a wild-type hamster with an ablated SCN. After this procedure, the formerly wild-type hamster displayed a shortened period which resembled the tau mutant. This result led to the conclusion that the SCN is sufficient and necessary for mammalian circadian rhythms.

Further investigation of the SCN as a central structure of circadian rhythms by Silver, et al. found that the SCN can control circadian rhythmicity by a diffusive signal. They transplanted the SCN as previously done by Menaker, but they encapsulated the graft thus preventing outgrowth by mutant SCN neurons. Even with the SCN restrained in this way the wild type hamster displayed a shorter period consistent with the period of the SCN donated by the mutant tau hamster, suggesting the SCN emits diffusable factors to control circadian rhythms. That same year, Gianluca Tosini and Menaker also determined that hamster retinas cultured in vitro produced a consistent circadian rhythm, as measured by melatonin levels. This suggests that there are multiple oscillators, or multiple neurons that compose a single oscillator sufficient for circadian outputs.

=== Molecular identification of the tau locus ===
It was still uncertain as to exactly which genetic locus the tau mutation was found, and which protein it affected. In 2000, Menaker collaborated with other scientists in the field to use genetically directed representational difference analysis (GDRDA), a new technique in molecular genetics that allowed them to accomplish this goal.

GDRDA works by first generating polymorphic genetic markers for a monogenic trait (which the tau has already been proven to be) that can be directly identified in the genome. This is done by separating progeny from a cross, based on the phenotype of interest and then creating amplicons of pooled DNA from each group. With these groups of amplified DNA, it can be determined which loci are enriched in the group exhibiting the phenotype of interest. These enriched loci are the genetic markers for the trait of interest.

The genetic markers for the tau mutants mapped to chromosome 22. The region of conserved synteny was the gene casein kinase I epsilon (CKIe). This is consistent with CKIe's homology to the Drosophila circadian control gene doubletime (dbt). From this work it was also shown that CK1e could interact with the mammalian PERIOD protein in vitro and effect the expression of Per1. From this work, the Takahashi lab successfully validated the tau mutant genetically by discovering the affected locus and subsequently established a model of circadian protein interaction by which the effects of the tau mutation could be explained.

=== Establishing methamphetamine-sensitive circadian oscillator (MASCO) in mice ===
Although previous studies demonstrate that methamphetamine (MAP) has a significant effect on the circadian behavior of rats, suggesting evidence of the SCN-independent, MAP-sensitive circadian oscillator (MASCO), Menaker and colleagues chose to look at MASCO in mice. The work done by Menaker and colleagues looked at the effects of chronic MAP expression on two strains of intact and SCN-lesioned mice in constant dark and constant light conditions.

MAP in the drinking water generated circadian locomotor rhythmicity in SCN lesioned mice. When MAP was removed, the free-running locomotor rhythm persisted for as long as fourteen cycles. This study also showed that small increases in MAP caused an increase in daily wheel-running activity and the length of the circadian period for intact mice and SCN-lesioned mice in constant dark and constant light conditions. The observations of Menaker and colleagues indicate that MASCO, a circadian oscillator, functions separately from the "master clock" of the SCN and is sufficient for locomotor circadian rhythm control.

This study disproves the "hourglass" mechanism hypothesis for MASCO proposed by Ruis, et al. This hypothesis states that the spontaneous consumption of MAP in drinking water by rodents results in lengthened bouts of activity, followed by sleep. The cycle is reinforced when the animal awakes and drinks once more. Menaker and colleagues tested SCN-lesioned, arrhythmic mice in constant darkness and found that when the MAP was no longer consumed at rhythmic intervals, constant rhythms in locomotor behavior were still found. In another trial, MAP was alternated every other day with water, and locomotor rhythm persisted on days with just the water. Both of these findings made clear that the "hourglass" hypothesis for the mechanism of MASCO was not valid.

=== Molecular mechanism of MASCO ===
Menaker and colleagues investigated if MASCO affected the molecular feedback loop underlying the currently accepted model for circadian rhythmicity in mammals. This investigation was done by treating arrhythmic mice lacking or with mutations to various genes in this feedback loop with MAP dosages. These genes included mutations and deletions to Per1, Per2, Cry1, Cry2, Bmal1, Npas2, CLOCK and CK1e. All of these mutants continued to respond and exhibit changes in free-running rhythms in the presence of MAP, despite mutational breaks in the feedback loop for circadian oscillation. In these arrhythmic animals, regardless of mutation or knockout of critical clock genes, MAP restored rhythm of circadian properties. This suggests that the molecular mechanism for MASCO is radically different from the known and accepted circadian oscillation model in mammals, and the feedback loop is not necessary for the generation of circadian locomotor rhythmicity by MAP.

== Later work ==
Menaker's lab group at University of Virginia was focused on the organization of circadian systems in vertebrates. The lab worked with a transgenic rat model with Per1 gene linked to a luciferase reporter to track the circadian expression patterns of the Per1 gene in brain and peripheral tissues. They anticipated this data to address if the clocks in all tissues remain in synchrony with a change in light cycle, and the clock-related signals from the brain to peripheral tissues .

Menaker discovered another mutant hamster, this time showing a free-running period of 25 hours in conditions of constant darkness. Menaker's graduate student, Ashli Moore, was a teaching assistant in his colleague's animal behavior course when an undergraduate student insisted on trading in her hamster for one that had a period more closely resembling that of her classmates' hamsters. Menaker bred this mutant hamster with three different females to produce litters with Mendalian ratios of wild-type and heterozygous mutants. He subsequently bred homozygous mutants with a free-running period of 28 hours. Menaker's lab was in collaboration with Carla Green's molecular biology lab at University of Texas Southwestern Medical Center to study this mutant hamster line further.

== Awards and honors ==
- William Greig Lapham Fellow, Princeton University, 1957-1958
- National Science Foundation Predoctoral Fellow, Princeton University, 1958-1959
- NIH, NSF Postdoctoral Fellowship, Harvard University, 1960-1962
- Career Development Award, National Institutes of Health, 1970-1975
- Guggenheim Fellowship, University of Montpellier, France, 1971-1972
- Fellow, American Association for the Advancement of Science, elected 1983
- Benjamin Meaker Visiting Professor, University of Bristol, UK, 1986
- Commonwealth Professor of Biology, University of Virginia, 1987–?
- Fellow, Japan Society for the Promotion of Science, 1992
- Fellow, American Academy of Arts & Sciences, elected 1999
- Lifetime Achievement Award, American Society of Photobiology, 2002
- Virginia's Outstanding Scientists and Industrialists: Life Achievement in Science Award, 2003
- Peter C. Farrell Prize in Sleep Medicine, Harvard Medical School Division of Sleep Medicine, 2007
- University of Virginia Distinguished Scientist Award, 2009
- University of Groningen Honorary Doctorate, 2009
- Honma Life Science Foundation, Sapporo, Japan, Aschoff-Honma Prize, 2009

== See also ==
- Colin Pittendrigh
- Gene Block
- PER1
- Circadian rhythm
