= Sandestin Golf and Beach Resort =

Destination resort in Florida, U.S.

Coordinates: 30°22′47″N 86°19′49″W

Sandestin Golf and Beach Resort is a 2,400-acre (9.7 km^{2}) destination resort in Miramar Beach, Florida, United States, on Northwest Florida's Gulf Coast. The resort is located between the Gulf of Mexico and the Choctawhatchee Bay.

== History ==
Sandestin was built on undeveloped land but was designed to look like it had grown out of a historic fishing village.

== Facilities ==
Sandestin has 30 neighborhoods with 1,600 condominiums, houses, villas, town homes, and hotel accommodations. The accommodations are group into four resort areas: Beachside, Village, Bayside, and Lakeside (formerly Dockside).

Sandestin has two conference centers – Linkside Conference Center and Baytowne Conference Center.

The Village of Baytowne Wharf in Sandestin is the resort's central dining and retail venue, with shops and boutiques, restaurants and eateries, and nightlife.

== Activities ==
Sandestin has over seven miles (11 km) of beaches and bay front, four golf courses, 15 tennis courts, 19 swimming pools, a 113-slip marina, children's programs, a fitness center and spa. It also includes a zip line, carousel, ropes course, and bungee jump.

Sandestin has 15 private tennis courts in hard and Hydrogird clay. The tennis center includes a clubhouse, private tennis courts, ladies tennis and children's offerings, and a tennis shop.

Spa Sandestin provides hairstyling, nail design, facials, therapeutic body treatments and massage.

The Sandestin Fitness Center has specialized services and equipment supported by certified instructors.

Sandestin has jet skis, canoes, boogie boards, kayaks, pontoon boats, sailing, snorkeling and scuba diving. The Baytowne Marina also offers evening cruises, bay fishing and deep sea fishing.

== Golf ==
Sandestin has three public golf courses, plus the semi-private Burnt Pine Golf Course.

The Raven Golf Club was designed by Robert Trent Jones, Jr. and opened for play in March 2000. It has formerly hosted both PGA Champions Tour and Korn Ferry Tour stops. This course meanders through wetlands and is noted for water features, bunkering and fairways lined with tall pines. The Tifeagle greens are fast in speed. Raven plays from 5,060 to 6,931 yards (4,627 to 6,338 m).

Burnt Pine Golf Club was designed by architect Rees Jones, and opened for play in 1994. This 18-hole course winds through wetlands and marshes. The many water features of this course come into play on 14 holes including three holes on the bay. The greens are medium in size and fast in speed with large undulations. Burnt Pine plays from 5,153 to 7,001 yards (6,402 m).

Baytowne Golf Club is Tom Jackson's second golf course at Sandestin; it opened in 1984 and was renovated in 2005. The rolling fairways of this course are lined with tall pines and lead to large, undulating greens that are moderate in speed. Water comes into play on twelve holes and the entire course is heavily bunkered. Baytowne is a par 71 course, and plays from 3,002 to 6,804 yards (2,745 to 6,222 m).

The Links Golf Club winds alongside the Choctawhatchee Bay. Designed by architect Tom Jackson, this course opened for play in 1973. The medium-sized greens are moderately undulating and moderate in speed. Water hazards come into play on 14 holes including five holes on the bay. The Links Course plays from 4,969 to 6,710 yards (4,544 to 6,136 m).
