= Guy Bloch =

Israeli zoologist

- גיא בלוך
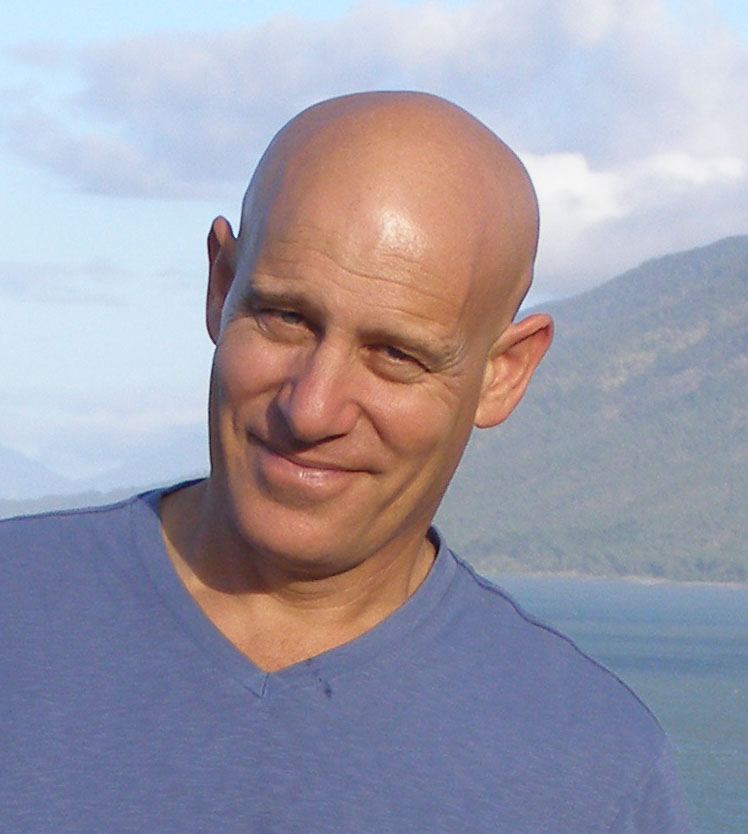
- Born: May 23, 1962 (age 64)
- Education: Tel Aviv University
- Scientific career
- Fields: Animal behavior, sociobiology, entomology, chronobiology
- Workplaces: The Alexander Silberman Institute of Life Sciences, the Hebrew University, Jerusalem, Israel
- Website: guybloch.huji.ac.il

Guy Bloch (Hebrew: גיא בלוך; born May 23, 1962) is an Israeli scientist. He is a professor at the Alexander Silberman Institute of Life Sciences, the Hebrew University of Jerusalem. His research focuses on the evolution and the molecular and physiological basis of social behavior and sociality in bees.

== Biography ==
Guy Bloch was born and raised in Kibbutz Nahshon and Moshav Kfar Bilu. He holds a bachelor's degree in Biology and MSc and a PhD degrees in Zoology from Tel Aviv University. In 1997-2001 he was a post-doctoral fellow with Prof. Gene Robinson at the University of Illinois at Urbana-Champaign (UIUC).

== Scientific and academic career ==
When Bloch returned to Israel in 2001, he founded the research group for the study of social behavior in bees at the Department of Ecology, Evolution and Behavior at the Alexander Silberman Institute of Life Sciences in the Faculty of Natural Sciences at the Hebrew University. In 2008 he was invited to serve as a Visiting Professor at the University of Auckland in New Zealand and in Arizona State University (ASU). In 2015, he won the Clark-Way Harrison Visiting Scholar Award and spent a year at Washington University in St. Louis. Bloch was head of the Hebrew University's Department of Ecology, Evolution and Behavior (2009-2015), member of the Hebrew University Senate, head of the Hebrew University fellowship committee, and head of the Institute of Life Sciences (from 10/2022).

Bloch's research focuses on understanding the evolution of sociality and the physiological and molecular basis of social behavior using bees (mainly bumble bees and honey bees) as the main research model. The main research topics include understanding the interrelationships between biological clocks, sleep control and social behavior, the influence of hormones, especially juvenile hormone (JH), on the evolution of sociality and social behavior, and deciphering the sociobiology of bumble bee colonies, including mechanisms determining body size and caste determination. Some of his group findings include the characterization of the molecular clockwork of bees, the discovery and characterization of remarkable socially regulated plasticity in the biological clock allowing bees to be active around the clock. Additional studies have shown that the JH has a central effect on social behavior in bees, but the effect is different in bumble bees and honey bees.

Bloch's research group was the first to show that RNA editing may affect social behavior. The group also characterized charred honey bee remains in the oldest hives ever found in the world

== Awards and recognition ==
- Fulbright and BARD scholarships in 1997
