= Patricia DeCoursey =

American biologist (1932–2022)

Patricia Jackson DeCoursey (December 28, 1932 – January 1, 2022) was an American biologist. A leading researcher in the field of chronobiology, her research focused on behavioral, physiological, and ecological aspects of mammalian circadian rhythms. She is credited with creating the first Phase Response Curve (PRC). PRC’s are used throughout the field today to help illustrate the change of a biological oscillation in response to an external stimulus. She worked as a biology professor at the University of South Carolina (USC) from 1967 until her retirement as director of the W. Gordon Belser Arboretum in 2019.

== Biography ==
At an early age, DeCoursey expressed much interest in nature. She became fascinated with the outdoors though traveling with her father, a physician, and the rest of her family to remote wilderness areas While attending Hunter College High School in New York City she began collecting data on the songbirds of a hardwood forest in Long Island. She mapped the number and location of the birds as well as their distinctive calls. She entered this project in the 1950 Westinghouse Science Talent Search and was named a finalist along with her twin sister Cynthia (Jackson) Fisher.

=== Education ===
DeCoursey's interest in ornithology led her to Cornell University, where she received a degree in zoology in 1954. She met George DeCoursey at Cornell University, where he was a student at the time. She married George DeCoursey in 1954. DeCoursey furthered her education at the University of Wisconsin, Madison where she earned a Ph.D. in zoology and biochemistry. She did postdoctoral research with Jürgen Aschoff at the Max-Planck Institute for Behavioral Physiology in Erling-Andech, Germany for two years. She then continued her research at Washington State University,

=== Career ===
DeCoursey was a distinguished professor of biology at University of South Carolina, researching mammalian circadian rhythms since she moved there with her husband in 1966.

=== Death ===
DeCoursey died in Columbia, South Carolina, on January 1, 2022, at the age of 89.

== Contributions to chronobiology ==
=== Phase Response Curve ===
Decoursey is credited with the first published Phase Response Curve (PRC). The relevant paper was about flying squirrels kept in constant darkness and how they would respond to different pulses of light at different times of the day. The compilation of this data produced the first PRC.

=== Mammalian Entrainment System ===
DeCoursey was the first scientist to show that the mammalian clocks can be reset by light pulses. She also showed that the photoreceptive system responsible for entrainment is different from the system involved in visual image perception.

=== Adaptive Value ===
DeCoursey helped the scientific world understand the adaptive value of the mammalian biological clocks (found within the suprachiasmatic nucleus (SCN)). From April 1997-October 1998 she set up an enclosure for approximately 74 chipmunks. 30 chipmunks had lesions in their SCN, 24 others were surgical control and 20 others were intact controls. After 80 days she showed that the majority of the chipmunks killed by predators had lesions in their SCN. This gave evidence to support that having a mammalian circadian clock is a favorable trait that has been naturally selected for. In an outdoor enclosure, DeCoursey released white-tailed antelope ground squirrels which had various levels of SCN lesioned. The squirrels displaying the most activity during the night had the highest amount of lesioning. This research has helped further our understanding of sleep related issues affecting humans such as jet lag or insomnia.

=== Later research ===
Her later research focused on the physiological and behavioral aspects of circadian rhythms. She studied how the retina moves in response to the daily rhythm. Also, as mentioned above, her work on chipmunks helped uncover the adaptive value of the circadian clock in the wild. She has done experiments related to the adaptive value of clocks on antelope squirrels and golden-mantled squirrels. This research furthers our understanding of sleep-related issues affecting humans such as jet lag or insomnia.

=== Other achievements ===
DeCoursey received the 2011 South Carolina Environmental Awareness Award for re-foresting the W. Gordon Belser Arboretum at the University of South Carolina, a ten-year initiative she led, as well as for various small gardens around the university. The arboretum is designated as an outdoor field classroom and laboratory for UofSC undergraduates, and it is also used for conducting a variety of educational outreach programs. According to an article in Scientific American, DeCoursey "spends half her work time on the restoring the arboretum and organizing class visits, and the other half on her professorial duties."

Decoursey was a member of the original Organizing Committees for both the Journal of Biological Rhythms and the Society for Research on Biological Rhythms (SRBR). She was an active member on the Advisory Board for both groups and served two terms as SRBR’s Secretary.

DeCoursey was one of the activists who worked to create what is now the Congaree National Park.

== Selected publications ==
- DeCoursey P (2004). "Diversity of Function of SCN Pacemakers in Behavior and Ecology of Three Species of Sciurid Rodents". Biological Rhythm Research. 35 (1–2): 1–2. Bibcode:2004BioRR..35...13D. doi:10.1080/09291010412331313214. S2CID 86537875.
- DeCoursey PJ (1960a). "Daily light sensitivity rhythm in a rodent". Science. 131 (3392): 33–35. Bibcode:1960Sci...131...33D. doi:10.1126/science.131.3392.33. PMID 13814727.
- DeCoursey PJ (1960b). "Phase control of activity in a rodent". Cold Spring Harbor Symposia on Quantitative Biology. 25: 49–55. doi:10.1101/sqb.1960.025.01.006. PMID 13721130.
- DeCoursey PJ (1989) Photoentrainment of circadian rhythms: An ecologist’ viewpoint In Circadian Clocks and Ecology, T Hiroshige and K Honma, eds, pp 187–206, Hokkaido University Press, Sapporo.
