= Journal of Biological Rhythms =

- Discipline: Life Sciences
- Language: English
- Edited by: Mary E. Harrington

Publication details
- History: 1986-present
- Publisher: SAGE Publications
- Frequency: Bimonthly
- Impact factor: 3.649 (2021)

Standard abbreviations
- ISO 4: J. Biol. Rhythms

Indexing
- CODEN: JBRHEE
- ISSN: 0748-7304 (print); 1552-4531 (web)
- LCCN: 86655794
- OCLC no.: 11000168

Links
- Journal homepage; Online access; Online archive

The Journal of Biological Rhythms is a bimonthly peer-reviewed scientific journal that covers chronobiology or any rhythms, especially biological rhythms with a special emphasis on seasonal and circadian rhythms. The journal publishes primary reports, reviews, commentaries, or letters. The Journal of Biological Rhythms has been in publication since 1986 and is currently published by SAGE Publications. The journal is the official publication of the Society for Research on Biological Rhythms. The editor-in-chief is Mary E. Harrington.

== History ==
The journal was established in March 1986 as the official publication of the Society for Research on Biological Rhythms with Benjamin Rusak as first editor-in-chief; he served from 1986 to 1994. The first issue largely focused on zoology and physiology, but over the years the field of discussion has expanded to include neurobiology, cell and molecular biology, photobiology, computational biology, behavioral ecology, and translational medicine. Early research topics included "splitting", circannual rhythmicity, photoperiodic time measurement, and circadian pacemaker development, coupling, and output.

The original publishing company before SAGE Publishing was Guilford Press. In 1997, the frequency of the journal changed from quarterly to bimonthly. In 2001, under editor-in-chief Martin Zatz, the journal began to release a number of special issues and special features.

== Editors ==
The following persons are or have been editor-in-chief:

- Benjamin Rusak (1986–1994)
- Fred W. Turek (1995–1999)
- Martin Zatz (2000–2013)
- William J. Schwartz (2014–2020)
- Mary E. Harrington (2020-present)

== Abstracting and indexing ==
The journal is abstracted and indexed in:

- Aquatic Sciences and Fisheries Abstracts
- Biological Abstracts
- BIOSIS Previews
- CAB Abstracts
- Chemical Abstracts Service
- Current Contents/Life Sciences
- EBSCO databases
- Embase
- Index Medicus/MEDLINE/PubMed
- Inspec
- ProQuest databases
- PsycINFO
- Science Citation Index Expanded
- Scopus
- The Zoological Record

According to the Journal Citation Reports, the journal has a 2021 impact factor of 3.649.
