= List of things named after Lord Rayleigh =

Lord Rayleigh (John William Strutt, 3rd Baron Rayleigh, 12 November 1842 – 30 June 1919) was a British physicist and mathematician who is the source of the following terms:

== Science and Mathematics ==
- Experiments of Rayleigh and Brace
- Rayleigh bandwidth
- Rayleigh beamwidth
- Rayleigh–Carson reciprocity
- Rayl, rayl or Rayleigh
- Rayleigh–Faber–Krahn inequality
- Rayleigh–Jeans law
  - Rayleigh–Jeans catastrophe
- Rayleigh–Ritz method
- Rayleigh–Schrödinger perturbation theory
- Rayleigh's method of dimensional analysis
- Rayleigh criterion
- Rayleigh's criterion (thermoacoustics)
- Rayleigh differential equation
- Rayleigh dissipation function
- Rayleigh distance
- Rayleigh distribution
- Rayleigh frequency
  - Rayleigh mixture distribution
- Rayleigh fading
- Rayleigh's film
- Rayleigh flight
- Rayleigh's formulas
- Rayleigh fractionation
- Rayleigh's identity
- Rayleigh interferometer
- Rayleigh law
- Rayleigh–Lorentz pendulum
- Rayleigh law on low-field magnetization
- Rayleigh length
- Rayleigh limit
- Rayleigh–Gans approximation
- Rayleigh plot
- Rayleigh quotient
  - Rayleigh quotient iteration
  - Rayleigh's quotient in vibrations analysis
- Rayleigh test
- Rayleigh theorem
- Rayleigh theorem for eigenvalues
- Rayleigh scattering
  - Filtered Rayleigh scattering
  - Forced Rayleigh scattering
  - Hyper–Rayleigh scattering
- Rayleigh roughness criterion
- Rayleigh sky model
- Rayleigh–Sommerfeld diffraction theory
- Rayleigh wave equation
- Rayleigh waves

=== Fluid mechanics ===
- Rayleigh's criterion
- Janzen–Rayleigh expansion
- Plateau–Rayleigh instability
- Rayleigh–Bénard convection
- Rayleigh–Plesset equation
- Rayleigh–Taylor instability
- Rayleigh's equation (fluid dynamics)
  - Rayleigh–Kuo criterion
- Rayleigh flow
- Rayleigh number
- Rayleigh problem
- Rayleigh Still

=== Astronomical objects ===
- 22740 Rayleigh
- Rayleigh 75.6°S 240.9°W, a Martian crater
- Rayleigh (lunar crater)

== Others ==
- Rayleigh Medal, awarded by the Institute of Acoustics
- Rayleigh Medal and Prize, awarded by the Institute of Physics

== See also ==
- Rayleigh (disambiguation)
