= Rayleigh criterion =

Rayleigh criterion may refer to:

- Angular resolution § The Rayleigh criterion, optical angular resolution
- Taylor–Couette flow § Rayleigh's criterion, instability criterion in Taylor–Couette flow
- Rayleigh roughness criterion, surface roughness criterion in optics
- Rayleigh criterion (thermo-acoustic instability), criterion for thermo-acoustic instability
- Rayleigh–Kuo criterion
