= Saturn's hexagon =

Cloud pattern on the planet Saturn

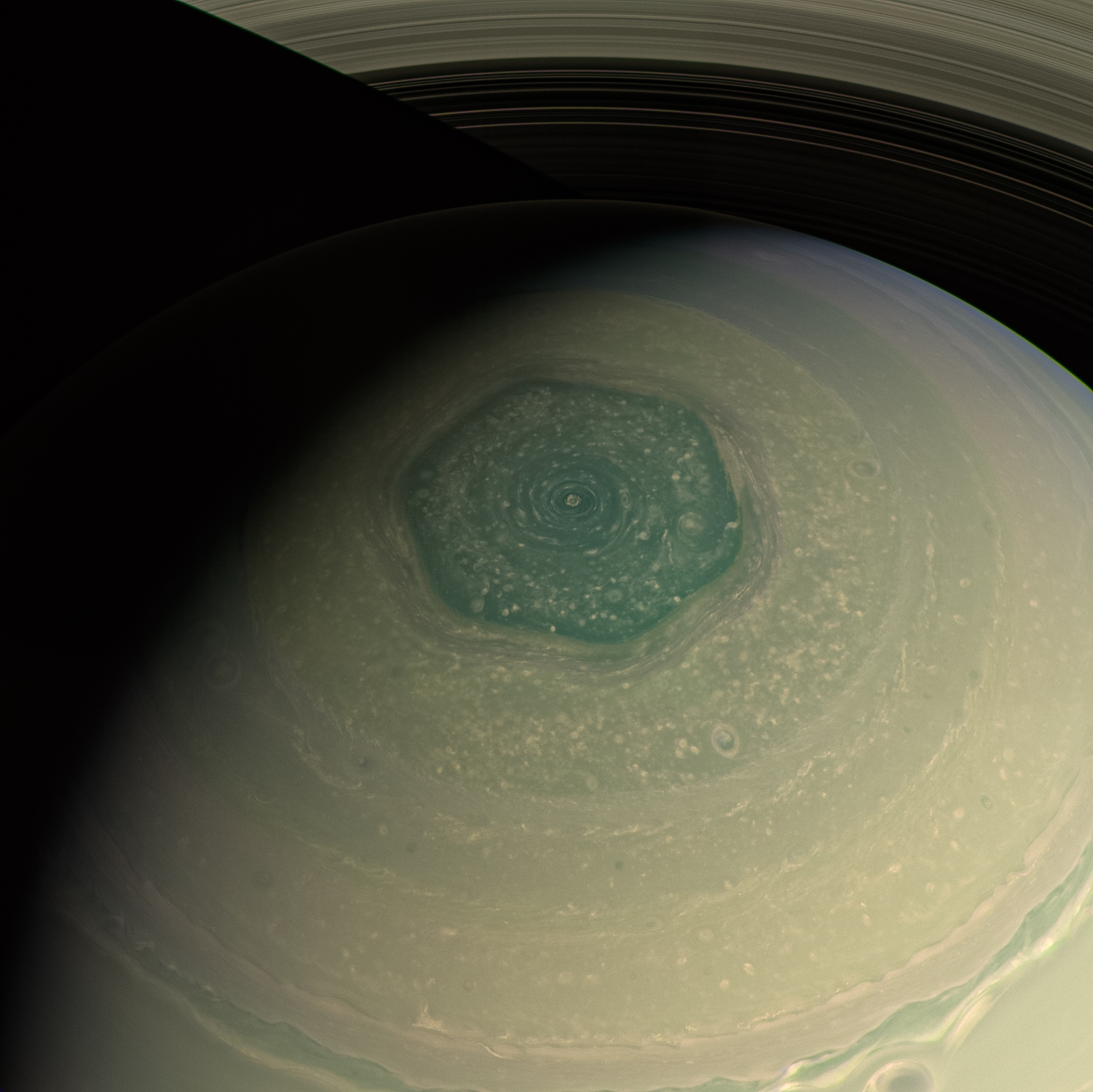
A partial view of Saturn's north pole, 2013

Saturn's hexagon is a persistent approximately hexagonal cloud pattern around the north pole of the planet Saturn, located at about 78°N. The sides of the hexagon are about 14,500 km (9,000 mi) long, which is about 2,000 km (1,200 mi) longer than the diameter of Earth. The hexagon is around 300 km (190 mi) high, and may be a jet stream made of atmospheric gases moving at 320 km/h (200 mph). It rotates with a period of 10h 39m 24s, the same period as Saturn's radio emissions from its interior. The hexagon does not shift in longitude like other clouds in the visible atmosphere.

Saturn's hexagon was discovered during the Voyager mission in 1981, and was later revisited by Cassini-Huygens in 2006. During the Cassini mission, the hexagon changed from a mostly blue color to more of a golden color. Saturn's south pole does not have a hexagon, as verified by Hubble observations, but a decagon-shaped atmospheric wave pattern that formed around 2023. Multiple hypotheses for the hexagonal cloud pattern have been developed.

== Discovery ==
Saturn's polar hexagon was discovered by David Godfrey in 1987 from piecing together fly-by views from the 1981 Voyager mission, and was revisited in 2006 by the Cassini mission.

Cassini was able to take only thermal infrared images of the hexagon until it passed into sunlight in January 2009. Cassini was also able to take a video of the hexagonal weather pattern while traveling at the same speed as the planet, therefore recording only the movement of the hexagon.

== Color ==
2013 and 2017: hexagon color changes

Between 2012 and 2016, the hexagon changed from a mostly blue color to more of a golden color. One hypothesis for this is that sunlight is creating haze as the pole is exposed to sunlight due to the change in season. These changes were observed by the Cassini spacecraft.

== Explanations for hexagon shape ==
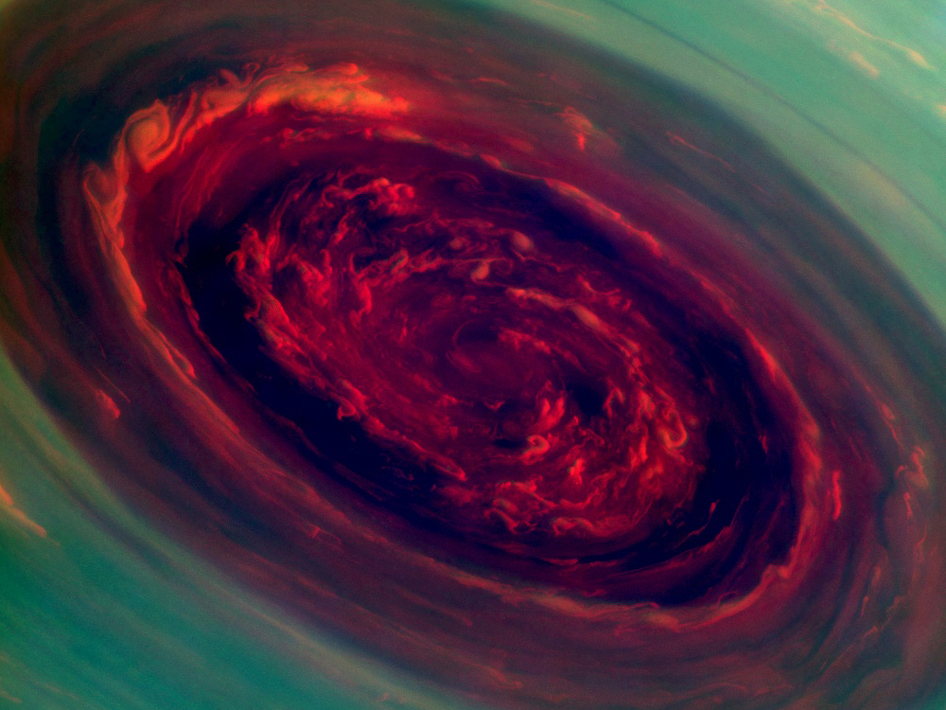
False-color image from the Cassini probe of the central vortex deep inside the hexagon formation

An early hypothesis attributed the hexagon to Rossby waves.

A hypothesis developed at Oxford University is the hexagon forms where there is a steep latitudinal gradient in the speed of the atmospheric winds in Saturn's atmosphere. Similar regular shapes were created in a laboratory when a circular tank of liquid was rotated at different speeds at its centre and periphery. The most common shape was six sided, but shapes with three to eight sides were also produced. The shapes form in an area of turbulent flow between the two different rotating fluid bodies with dissimilar speeds. A number of stable vortices of similar size form on the slower (south) side of the fluid boundary, and these interact with each other to space themselves out evenly around the perimeter. The presence of the vortices influences the boundary to move northward where each is present, and this gives rise to the polygon effect. Polygons do not form at wind boundaries unless the speed differential and viscosity parameters are within certain margins and thus absent at other likely places, such as Saturn's south pole or the poles of Jupiter.

Other researchers claim that lab studies exhibit vortex streets, a series of spiraling vortices not observed in Saturn's hexagon. Simulations show a shallow, slow, localized meandering jetstream in the same direction as Saturn's prevailing clouds are able to match the observed behaviors of Saturn's hexagon with the same boundary stability.

Developing barotropic instability of Saturn's North Polar hexagonal circumpolar jet (Jet) plus North Polar vortex (NPV) system produces a long-living structure akin to the observed hexagon, which is not the case of the Jet-only system, which was studied in this context in a number of papers in literature. The NPV, thus, plays a decisive dynamical role to stabilize hexagon jets. The influence of moist convection, which was recently suggested to be at the origin of Saturn's NPV system in the literature, is investigated in the framework of the barotropic rotating shallow water model and does not alter the conclusions.

A 2020 mathematical study at the California Institute of Technology found that a stable geometric arrangement of the polygons can occur on any planet when a storm is surrounded by a ring of winds turning in the opposite direction to the storms itself, called an anticyclonic ring, or anticyclonic shielding. Such shielding creates a vorticity gradient in the background of a neighbor cyclone, causing mutual rejection between the cyclones (similar to the effect of beta-drift). Although apparently shielded, the polar cyclone on Saturn cannot hold a polygonal pattern of circumpolar cyclones such as Jupiter's due to the bigger size and slower wind speed of Saturn's polar cyclone, so the side-adjacent vortices and deep barotropic instability (Cassini's wind speed measurements preclude shallower barotropic instability at least at the time of the Cassini encounter), or possibly baroclinic instabilities remain as the most viable explanations for Saturn's sustained hexagon.

== See also ==
- Titanian polar vortices
