= Takashi Yoshimura =

Japanese physiologist and chronobiologist

- Born: March 3, 1970 (age 56); Shiga Prefecture, Japan
- Education: Nagoya University (B.S., M.S., Ph.D.)
- Known for: Chronobiology, Chemical Biology, Animal Molecular Physiology, Systems Biology, Endocrinology, Animal Reproduction

Takashi Yoshimura (吉村 崇; born March 3, 1970) is a Japanese physiologist and chronobiologist known for his research on the biological clocks that regulate seasonal reproduction in vertebrates. He currently serves as the director of the Institute of Transformative Bio-Molecules (WPI-ITbM) at Nagoya University, Japan.

== Early life and education ==
Takashi Yoshimura was born on March 3, 1970, in Shiga Prefecture, Japan. Yoshimura spent his childhood in nature, catching and breeding various wildlife such as beetles, fish, frogs, lizards, and turtles. His favorite childhood book was Souvenirs entomologiques by French entomologist Jean-Henri Fabre, as well as those written by Karl von Frisch. Yoshimura cites these childhood experiences and his interest in animal behavior as his motivation to study biology.

Yoshimura graduated from Nagoya University in 1993 with a Bachelor of Science in Animal Physiology. He received a Masters in Animal Physiology and a PhD in Animal Physiology from Nagoya University in 1995 and 1996, respectively. His thesis was titled ‘Studies on the mammalian circadian photoreceptors’. He was also a Japan Society for the Promotion of Science (JSPS) Doctoral Course Research Fellow from 1995–1996.

== Scientific career ==
=== Early career ===
Yoshimura began his professional career as an Assistant Professor in the School of Agricultural Science of Nagoya University from 1996–1999. He then moved to the Graduate School of Bioagricultural Science, continuing in his role of Assistant Professor from 1999–2005. In 2005, he was promoted to Associate Professor, and in 2008 he was promoted to Professor, a position he currently holds. Yoshimura was also appointed as a Visiting Professor at the National Institute for Basic Biology from 2013 to 2019.

=== Current work ===
Yoshimura is currently a Professor in the WPI Institute of Transformative Bio-Molecules (WPI-ITbM) and the Graduate School of Bioagricultural Sciences, Nagoya University. He is the head of the Lab of Animal Integrative Physiology, where Yoshimura’s research focuses on understanding the molecular mechanism of seasonal adaptation in vertebrates. The uniqueness of his research lies in the use of various vertebrate species, such as the Japanese quail, chicken, hamster, mouse, salmon, and medaka, together with an interdisciplinary approach. He currently serves as the Vice President of the Japanese Society for Chronobiology and is a fellow of the Royal Society of Biology.

== Research overview ==
Yoshimura’s research focuses on the biological clock mechanism that regulates seasonal reproduction in non-model vertebrates. His work has clarified the regulatory signal transduction pathways of seasonal reproduction, including the research on the production and regulation of the “springtime hormone.” Yoshimura’s research has also identified that this hormone directed reproduction mechanism is likely conserved among seasonal bird and mammalian species, though possessing different light pathways.

Yoshimura’s lab has continued to research nonreproductive regulatory mechanisms, having identified nonocular photosensors and novel genes. He has identified the gene Photoperiod Decoder 1 (phod1) as a modulator of the growth hormone pathway in fish, allowing for seasonal metabolic adaptation. Yoshimura has also studied the influence of exposomes on biological systems, focusing on how organisms can prioritize and react to multiple environmental factors. Exposomes refers to the measures an individual experiences in a lifetime, and how those influences affect health.

=== Springtime hormone ===
Much of Yoshimura’s research on the seasonal reproduction of vertebrates involves the thyroid-stimulating hormone (TSH), or the “springtime hormone.” He identified that in birds, TSH is produced in the pars tuberalis of the pituitary gland and acts as a critical regulator of seasonal reproduction by mediating photoperiodic signals to control their reproductive activities. By studying the TSH mechanism in birds, mammals, and fish, Yoshimura was able to demonstrate that increased day lengths induced TSH expression, activating a signal transduction cascade. TSH activates the expression of type 2 deiodinase in the mediobasal hypothalamus, leading to local activation of thyroid hormone triiodothyronine (T3) that induces gonadotropin-releasing hormone (GnRH) secretion. Yoshimura observed that though the photosensing pathways differ, the core mechanism was conserved across birds, mammals and fish, identifying the “springtime hormone" as a likely universal mechanism in vertebrates.

=== Non-ocular photosensors ===
Yoshimura’s research has identified the deep brain photoreceptor Opsin 5, a violet-sensitive pigment, in quails. He found that the Opsin 5-containing neurons were sufficient in mediating photoperiod-dependent testicular growth, a physiological response associated with seasonal breeding. Yoshimura demonstrated this sufficiency by showing that short-wavelength light induced testicular growth in eye-patched, pinealectomized quail. In mammals, the eyes are the primary photoreceptive organs, and removal of the eyes abolishes photoperiodic responses, suggesting that deep brain photoreception via OPN5 does not play a significant role in mammalian seasonal reproduction. Therefore, while OPN5-mediated photoreception is a critical mechanism for seasonal reproduction in birds, its role in mammals remains to be fully explained.

Yoshimura has also identified the saccus vasculosus, a brain organ in jawed fish located ventral to the hypothalamus and posterior to the pituitary gland as a possible seasonal sensor in fish. He found that saccus vasculosus samples can sufficiently respond to photoperiodic signals. By exposing organ-cultured saccus vasculosus to different photoperiods, a photoperiodic response in certain protein levels were measured. Furthermore, Yoshimura removed the saccus vasculosus and found that it lowered the expected photoperiod-induced increase in gonad development under short day conditions, demonstrating that the saccus vasculosus is necessary for gonadal photoperiod response. His findings were confirmed as later studies found that the saccus vasculosus is involved in the regulation of the reproductive function of cichlid fish.

== Awards and honors ==
In 2004, Yoshimura won the 2nd Japanese Society for Chronobiology Encouragement Award for his research on the molecular mechanisms of photoperiodism in vertebrates.

In 2008, Yoshimura received the JSPS Prize for his research titled ‘Seasonal Clock Percepts Coming of Spring in Vertebrate – Quail as a Model Animal’.

In 2009, Yoshimura received the Japanese Society of Animal Science Prize.

In 2010, he was awarded the Hoffenberg International Medal from the Society for Endocrinology. The title of his accompanying lecture was ‘Molecular and endocrine mechanism of seasonal reproduction in birds and mammals’. He was also named a Fellow of the Society for Biology.

In 2015, he received the Van Meter Award from the American Thyroid Association for his work studying the role of thyroid hormones in the seasonal reproduction of birds, mammals, and fish. Yoshimura was also awarded the 29th Kihara Memorial Foundation Academic Award for his research on the seasonal adaptation mechanisms of vertebrates and the Incentive Award from the Japan Society for Comparative Endocrinology.

In 2020, Yoshimura was awarded the Aschoff and Honma Prize in Biological Rhythm Research. His accompanying lecture was titled ‘Towards understanding molecular mechanisms of infradian rhythms'.

In 2024, Yoshimura was awarded Aschoff’s Ruler, one of the most prestigious honors in chronobiology, awarded by peers at the Gordon Research Conference on Chronobiology. Named after Jürgen Aschoff, a pioneer of biological rhythm research, the prize is passed annually between scientists working in different countries and on different model organisms. The 2023 recipient was Joseph Takahashi, a neuroscientist known for discovering the Clock gene. This honor places Yoshimura in an elite lineage of scientists shaping how we understand biological timing across species.
