= Christine Merlin =

French chronobiologist

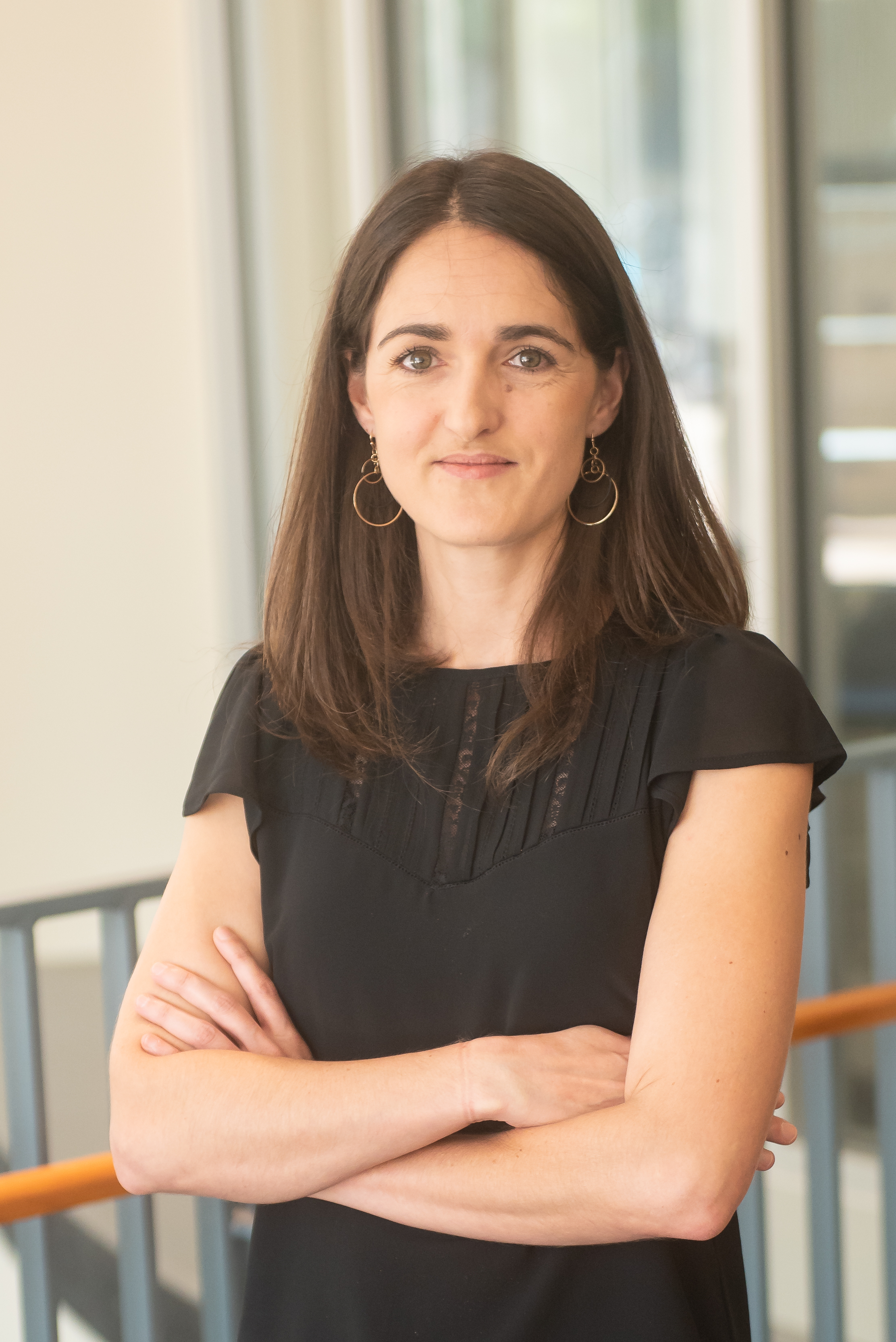
- Born: 24 September 1980 (age 45); Hautes-Pyrénées, France
- Education: Pierre and Marie Curie University
- Known for: Sun compass navigation in migratory monarch butterflies
- Scientific career
- Fields: Chronobiology, genetics, entomology
- Workplaces: Texas A&M University; University of Massachusetts Medical School; Pierre and Marie Curie University
- Website: https://www.merlinlab.org/

Christine Merlin is a French chronobiologist and an associate professor of biology at Texas A&M University. Merlin's research focuses on the underlying genetics of the monarch butterfly circadian clock and explores how circadian rhythms modulate monarch behavior and navigation.

== Background ==
Merlin was born on 24 September 1980, in southwestern France. She attended Pierre and Marie Curie University in Paris, where she received a BS in animal biology, an MS in invertebrate physiology, and finally her PhD in insect physiology in 2006. She studied circadian rhythms in moths in Versailles at the National Institute for Research on Agronomy in the lab of Emmanuelle Jacquin-Joly and Martine Maibeche-Coisne while studying for her doctorate. In 2007, she began working in the lab of Steven Reppert at the University of Massachusetts Medical School. There, she studied the migration of monarch butterflies, established reverse genetics in this new model system, and collaborated on a paper outlining the monarch genome.

In 2013, she became an assistant professor of biology at Texas A&M University, where she works now. She joined the Center of Biological Clocks Research as a faculty member studying biology, specifically the circadian clock regulation of monarch butterfly migration. She also became a faculty member of Texas A&M's Genetics and Neuroscience interdisciplinary program in 2014, as well as their Ecology and Evolutionary Biology interdisciplinary program in 2015.

== Scientific contributions ==
Merlin has helped publish over 25 papers during the course of her career and has garnered over 2000 citations for her work.

=== The migration of monarch butterflies and its control by circadian clocks ===
Monarch butterflies use the sun as a compass to precisely orient themselves across long distances during migration. Merlin and colleagues determined that circadian clocks located in the antennae play a significant role in navigation in migratory monarch butterflies. Using tests of necessity, Merlin and colleagues analyzed migratory butterfly orientation with intact antennae, without antennae, or with antennae coated with black paint, and concluded that butterflies without antennae or with antennae harboring desynchronized antennal clocks (coated black) were unable to orient relative to the sun. She isolated butterfly antennae in vitro and discovered that they sustained 24-hour rhythms in constant conditions after entrainment to light-dark cycles. By measuring the expression of clock genes Per, Tim, and Cry2, Merlin determined that a circadian clock exists in the monarch antennae, functioning independently of the brain clock.

Monarch butterflies use a time-compensated sun compass that is a part of the insect's light-entrained circadian clocks located in the antennae. Merlin and colleagues conducted a test of sufficiency to determine if one or both antennae are needed to properly orient. They found that either antenna can be sufficient for time compensation, but surprisingly, butterflies with one of their antennae painted black and the other painted clear, had disoriented flight. In this experimental condition, the antenna painted black would block entrainment from light cues while the antenna painted clear would allow entrainment from light cues. When the black-painted antenna from this experimental condition was ablated, the butterfly would then be able to properly orient by using just the single clear-painted antenna to entrain. The team also observed that Per and Tim gene expression was highly rhythmic in the clear-painted antennae, but disrupted in the black-painted antennae. Merlin and coworkers concluded that each antenna has its own clock outputs that are then processed together in the sun compass to direct the orientation of flight.

In 2011, Merlin (along with Steven Reppert, Shuai Zhan, and Jeffrey Boore) contributed to outlining the genome of the migratory monarch butterfly and described the operation of circadian clocks as a method of regulating migration. The monarch clock relies on a transcription-translation feedback loop (TTFL) that contains many of the same genetic components as the clocks of other arthropods, such as Drosophila melanogaster. One notable difference between the monarch clock and the Drosophila melanogaster clock is the appearance of both a light-sensitive CRY1 and a transcriptionally repressive CRY2 in the monarch clock, while Drosophila melanogaster only contains CRY1. As most arthropods have both CRY types, this result provided additional evidence that both CRY were at "the base of arthropod evolution." They highlighted two main uses for the clock. One use is for sun compass orientation, which allows the monarch to navigate towards its destination by detecting the horizontal position of the sun and the polarized skylight patterns produced. The other use is for the initiation of migration by detecting decreasing day length in the autumn.

=== Genetic editing: TALENs & CRISPR/Cas9 ===
Merlin and her lab have been consistently interested in exploring methods of selective genetic editing via tools such as zinc finger proteins, which enable the creation of targeted gene knockouts within a specified locus. In 2016, Merlin and colleagues demonstrated that both TALENs and CRISPR/Cas9 technologies could be utilized in a similar manner to create highly efficient, heritable, targeted mutagenesis at selected genomic loci. Merlin and her team were able to generate genetic knockouts of the Cry2 and Clk genes within the monarch genome, two notable clock genes responsible in part for the regulation and modulation of the monarch circadian clock. These knockouts were shown to be heritable, with the injection of fewer than 100 eggs being sufficient to recover mutant progeny, enabling the generation of mutant knockout lines in around 3 months. These findings provided new research methods for the genetic manipulation and study of monarch clock genes, as is currently being explored by the Merlin Lab.

=== Monarch migration, photoperiodic induction and genetics ===
While researching monarchs, Merlin headed a paper alongside graduate students Samantha E. Liams and Aldrin B. Lugena and delved into a deeper understanding of monarch migration, its concomitant photoperiodic induction of diapause, and the underlying genetic components. Monarchs who migrate in the fall experience a reproductive diapause response to prepare for their migration, which is triggered by the shortened days and colder temperatures of autumn. In laboratory conditions, female monarchs produce less mature oocytes in short photoperiods than in long ones, and Merlin and colleagues genetically demonstrated the involvement of clock genes in the response. They also identified the vitamin A pathway in the brain as being differentially regulated in a photoperiod manner. Using a CRISPR/Cas9-mediated loss-of-function mutant of the gene nina B1, a gene that encodes the rate-limiting enzyme that converts β-carotene into retinal, they demonstrated the necessity of this pathway for the photoperiodic induction of reproductive diapause. As in other insects, diapause in monarchs is known to result from juvenile hormone deficiency in the corpora cardiaca-corpora allata complex, but the link between the hormone and vitamin A is currently unknown.

=== Magnetoreception ===
In 2021, Merlin was credited with assisting in a research article focused on the magnetoreception of monarch butterflies. While the molecular and cellular mechanisms underlying magnetic sensing has not yet been discovered, the connection to the photoexcitation of CRY proteins has been linked to both CRY1 in Drosophila and CRY2 in monarchs and humans. This discovery in humans and monarchs was identified due to the finding that overexpression in CRY-deficient flies restored magnetosensitivity, suggesting they perform photochemical reactions for the magnetosensitivity in the fly's cellular environment. In order to test reorientation using magnetic inclination in monarchs, both fall migrant monarchs and wild-type laboratory monarchs were placed in a flight simulator that manipulated different magnetic field parameters: declination, inclination, and intensity. It was found that both variants of monarchs did not display hyperactivity to the geomagnetic field, but both variants did display an increase in wingbeats upon reversing magnetic inclination. Creating a behavioral assay from this experiment led to the evaluation that the Drosophila CRY1 (dpCry1) was necessary for monarch light-dependent magnetoreception, while the Drosophila CRY2 (dpCry2) was not. The antennae and compound eyes were tested to see if they were necessary for light-dependent magnetoreception. Blocking either one of these organs with black paint led to impaired responses to ambient magnetic inclination and reversal of ambient magnetic inclination. This indicates that the monarch's antennae and compound eyes are necessary for magnetosensing, and that impairing one of these organs cannot be compensated for by the other.

=== Ongoing research ===
As of 2021, the Merlin lab is currently focused on utilizing reverse genetic tools to further unravel clockwork mechanisms in the monarch, determine how previously identified candidate genes contribute to butterfly migration and photoperiodic sensing, as well as dissect the genetic basis of the magnetic sense. The lab is currently working with known clock genes in vivo to understand circadian repressive mechanisms within the monarch and gain further knowledge regarding how insect clocks have evolved. Merlin is also exploring means to expand the monarch genetic toolbox with a focus on developing a reliable CRISPR/Cas9-mediated knock-in approach to introduce reporter tags into loci of interest within the monarch genome and gain insights into the clock circuitry in the brain.

=== Timeline of selected publications ===
- Jacquin-Joly E and Merlin C (2004) Insect olfactory receptors: contributions of molecular biology to chemical ecology. J Chem Ecol. 30: 2359-97.
- Merlin C, Gegear RJ and Reppert SM (2009) Antennal circadian clocks coordinate sun compass orientation in migratory monarch butterflies. Science 325: 1700–1704.
- Zhan S, Merlin C, Boore JL and Reppert SM (2011) The monarch butterfly genome yields insights into long-distance migration. Cell 147: 1171–1185.
- Markert MJ, Zhang Y, Enuameh MS, Reppert SM, Wolfe SA and Merlin C (2016) Genomic Access to Monarch Migration Using TALEN and CRISPR/Cas9-Mediated Targeted Mutagenesis. G3: Genes, Genomes, Genetics.
- Reppert SM, Guerra PA and Merlin C (2016) Neurobiology of Monarch Butterfly Migration. Annual Review of Entomology. 61 (1): 25–42.
- Lugena AB, Zhang Y, Menet JS, and Merlin C (2019). Genome-wide discovery of the daily transcriptome, DNA regulatory elements and transcription factor occupancy in the monarch butterfly brain. PLOS Genetics, 15(7). doi:10.1371/journal.pgen.1008265
- Wan G, Hayden AN, Liams SE, Merlin C (2021) Cryptochrome 1 mediates light-dependent inclination magnetosensing in monarch butterflies. Nat Commun. 12(1):771.

== Honours and awards ==
The Merlin Lab receives funding from the National Science Foundation, the National Institutes of Health, and the Esther A. & Joseph Klingenstein Fund. Merlin has received the following awards for her work in circadian biology:

- Charles King Trust Postdoctoral Fellowship from The Medical Foundation (2012)
- Klingenstein-Simons Fellowship Award in Neuroscience (2017)
- Junior Faculty Research Award from the International Society for Research on Biological Rhythms (2018)
- Presidential Impact Fellowship at Texas A&M University (2020)

== See also ==
- Sun compass in animals
- Circadian clock
- Monarch butterfly migration
- Arthropod
- Necessity and sufficiency
