= Rayleigh Still =

In distillation, a Rayleigh Still is a separation process where a feed stream is charged and withdrawn batch-wise with a separate stream fed and removed continuously. It is also known as a Rayleigh Distillation. It consists of a single stage distillation where the batch-charged phase is well mixed during operation. This was developed originally by Lord Rayleigh in 1902.
