= Elizabeth Maywood =

English chronobiologist

- Born: Leeds, England
- Education: University of Bradford
- Awards: Aschoff's Rule Prize
- Scientific career
- Fields: Chronobiology: circadian functions of the suprachiasmatic nucleus (SCN)

Elizabeth Maywood is an English researcher who studies circadian rhythms and sleep in mice. Her studies are focused on the suprachiasmatic nucleus (SCN), a small region of the brain that controls circadian rhythms.

== Biography ==
Elizabeth Susan Maywood was born in Leeds, England. She attained a degree in Pharmacology before going on to obtain her Ph.D. in biochemical endocrinology in London. After receiving her Ph.D., in 1988 she joined Michael Hastings' group as a postdoc in the Department of Anatomy at the University of Cambridge (now part of the Physiology, Development and Neuroscience (PDN) Department) to study seasonal biology in Syrian hamsters. In 2001 she moved with Hastings to the MRC Laboratory of Molecular Biology in Cambridge, where he had set up a new research group to study the molecular neurobiology of circadian rhythms. Since then, she has moved the focus of her study to circadian rhythms and sleep.

== Research contributions ==
Early research in the field of chronobiology utilizing lesion experiments has suggested that the suprachiasmatic nucleus (SCN) serves as the master circadian clock of the mammalian brain and is entrained through retinal inputs. More recently, research on the SCN has focused on the function of individual neuropeptides and their complex interactions in the scope of the SCN circuitry. Research into the role of vasoactive intestinal polypeptide (VIP), gastrin-releasing peptide (GRP), arginine vasopressin (AVP), and GABA has started to paint a picture of the hierarchy of neuropeptides in the maintenance of circadian coherence in the SCN.

Maywood's research investigates the complex interactions of various neuropeptides and the role of events at the membrane in feedback loops in the SCN. Furthermore, Maywood's research also seeks to understand how different parts of the SCN coordinate rhythms and more broadly understand the interaction of the SCN with sleep.

=== Studies of CRY1/CRY2 in the Suprachiasmatic Nucleus ===
In one experiment, Maywood and her colleagues in the Hastings and Chin groups at the LMB aimed to control the Cry1 and Cry2 proteins responsible for proper functioning of transcriptional-translational negative feedback loops (TTFLs). To do this, the researchers used orthogonal aminoacyl-tRNA synthetase/tRNA brought to the SCN by an adeno-associated virus vector (AAV). The Cry1 protein carrying the AAV vector contained noncanonical amino acids (ncAA) and an ectopic amber stop codon resulting in a silencing mutation. When arrhythmic SCN slices lacking functional Cry1 were placed on culture mediums containing ncAA the TTFLs were genetically activated immediately, and the strength of activation depended on the dose of ncAA in the growth medium. When the ncAA medium was removed, TTFL activation disappeared. From these results, Maywood and her colleagues were able to demonstrate that within the SCN, Cry1 is necessary for circadian functioning. Rhythmicity, however, was found to be controlled by initiation of TTFL functioning. Ultimately, the study's results allowed the researchers to conclude that the circuit, cell, and animalian mechanisms required for circadian functioning are developmentally independent of the presence of Cry proteins.

=== Studies of VPAC2 in the Suprachiasmatic Nucleus ===
In another study, Maywood and colleagues utilized luciferase and GFP reporter genes and real-time imaging of cellular circadian gene expression across mice SCN slice cultures to investigate the role of VIPergic signaling. Through this research, Maywood and her colleagues at the Laboratory of Molecular Biology alongside Tony Harmar at the University of Edinburgh demonstrated that the Vipr2 gene, which encodes the VPAC2 receptor for Vasoactive intestinal polypeptide (VIP), is necessary both for maintenance of molecular timekeeping within individual suprachiasmatic nucleus neurons and between different SCN neurons.

Additionally, Maywood and colleagues have demonstrated that gastrin-releasing peptide (GRP), another SCN neuropeptide, can act as an enhancer and aid in synchronization of molecular timekeeping in the absence of VIPergic signals. This effect, however, is limited and insufficient to maintain coordinated molecular cycles for longer periods of time.

Maywood's research in this area has provided key insights into the SCN clockwork and how events at the membrane assist in driving intracellular feedback loops. These findings also indicate that the SCN has the distinctive property of spontaneous synchronization of inter-neuronal molecular timekeeping through the use of neuropeptidergic signaling.

=== Studies of Interaction between Suprachiasmatic Nucleus and Sleep ===
Maywood and colleagues also study interactions between the suprachiasmatic nucleus (SCN) and extra-SCN local clocks in the brain, contributing to knowledge concerning the circadian component in the two-process model of sleep regulation.

To study the effects of interactions between the SCN and local clocks in the brain, Maywood compared various sleep parameters in three different groups of mice:

1. wild type (WT) mice with 24 hour circadian periods
2. mutant CK1ε Tau mice having 20 hour circadian periods
3. chimeric CK1ε mice with dopamine 1a receptor (Drd1a) expressing cells in the SCN exhibiting 24h circadian periods and extra-SCN local clocks exhibiting 20-hour periods

The difference in period between the SCN and local clocks resulted in temporal misalignment for the chimeric mice.

The results from this study showed evidence that temporal misalignment between the SCN and local clocks compromised sleep architecture and overall sleep quality for the chimeric mice. Chimeric mice saw less NREM sleep than their temporally aligned counterparts, decreased sleep recovery abilities, and increased amounts of sleep fragmentation. These were all concluded to be the result of internal desynchronization between the SCN and local clocks. Additionally, the effects of circadian misalignment on sleep architecture affected the mices' cognitive abilities, where chimeric mice performed worse on sleep-dependent memory tasks than their counterparts. These results demonstrate the importance of temporal coherence between all clocks in the brain for maintaining effective circadian regulation of sleep.

While the specific contributions of local clocks across the brain remain unknown, Maywood's research has shed light on the importance of extra-SCN clocks. These tissues play important roles in circadian sleep regulation, and coordination between these clocks and the SCN can determine overall sleep quality.

== Awards ==
In 2011, Maywood was recognized with Aschoff's Rule prize
