= Rayleigh test =

Rayleigh test can refer to:

- a test for periodicity in irregularly sampled data,
- a derivation of the above to test for non-uniformity (as unimodal clustering) of a set of points on a circle (e.g. compass directions), sometimes known as the Rayleigh z test.

== See also ==
- Circular distribution
- Directional statistics
- Kuiper's test
- Rayleigh distribution
- Watson test
- Rayleigh plot
