= Hsiao-Lan Kuo =

American meteorologist (1915–2006)

- Born: 7 Feb 1915; Mancheng, Hebei, China
- Died: 2006 (aged 90–91); Chicago, Illinois, U.S.
- Education: Tsinghua University; Zhejiang University; University of Chicago
- Known for: model for hurricane Rayleigh-Kuo theorem
- Awards: Rossby Medal (1970)
- Scientific career
- Fields: meteorology
- Workplaces: MIT; University of Chicago
- Doctoral advisor: Carl-Gustaf Rossby

Hsiao-Lan Kuo
- Traditional Chinese: 郭曉嵐
- Simplified Chinese: 郭晓岚
Transcriptions
Standard Mandarin
- Hanyu Pinyin: Guō Xiǎolán

Hsiao-Lan Kuo (Guo Xiaolan; 1915–2006) was a Chinese-American mathematician and meteorologist. He was a recipient of the Carl-Gustaf Rossby Research Medal.

== Career ==
Born in Mancheng County, Hebei Province on February 7, 1915, Kuo obtained his B.Sc. from Tsinghua University (1937), a M.Sc. from Zhejiang University (1942, under advisor Coching Chu), and a Ph.D. from the University of Chicago (1948, advisor Carl-Gustaf Rossby).

From 1949 to 1961, Kuo worked as a research associate, later a senior specialist, and finally the project director on the Hurricane Project at the Massachusetts Institute of Technology (MIT). He was Professor Emeritus at the Department of Geophysical Sciences at the University of Chicago.

Kuo was an academician of Academia Sinica (1988 election).

== Works ==
Kuo developed important mathematical tools to describe the complex circulation patterns of atmospheric activity. He helped to mathematically model the birth of a tropical cyclone (hurricane). Kuo's work is an important part of the theoretical foundation for modern meteorology. He is considered as a member of the Chicago School of Meteorology, which started from Carl-Gustaf Rossby.

For this reason, in 1970, Kuo was awarded the Carl-Gustaf Rossby Research Medal from the American Meteorological Society (AMS), which is the highest honor for atmospheric science.

The Rayleigh-Kuo theorem or Rayleigh-Kuo Criterion, a necessary condition for barotropically unstable fluid, is named after him.
