= Rayleigh theorem for eigenvalues =

In mathematics, the Rayleigh theorem for eigenvalues pertains to the behavior of the solutions of an eigenvalue equation as the number of basis functions employed in its resolution increases. Rayleigh, Lord Rayleigh, and 3rd Baron Rayleigh are the titles of John William Strutt, after the death of his father, the 2nd Baron Rayleigh. Lord Rayleigh made contributions not just to both theoretical and experimental physics, but also to applied mathematics. The Rayleigh theorem for eigenvalues, as discussed below, enables the energy minimization that is required in many self-consistent calculations of electronic and related properties of materials, from atoms, molecules, and nanostructures to semiconductors, insulators, and metals. Except for metals, most of these other materials have an energy or a band gap, i.e., the difference between the lowest, unoccupied energy and the highest, occupied energy. For crystals, the energy spectrum is in bands and there is a band gap, if any, as opposed to energy gap. Given the diverse contributions of Lord Rayleigh, his name is associated with other theorems, including Parseval's theorem. For this reason, keeping the full name of "Rayleigh Theorem for Eigenvalues" avoids confusions.

== Statement of the theorem ==
The theorem, as indicated above, applies to the resolution of equations called eigenvalue equations. i.e., the ones of the form HѰ = λѰ, where H is an operator, Ѱ is a function and λ is number called the eigenvalue. To solve problems of this type, we expand the unknown function Ѱ in terms of known functions. The number of these known functions is the size of the basis set. The expansion coefficients are also numbers. The number of known functions included in the expansion, the same as that of coefficients, is the dimension of the Hamiltonian matrix that will be generated. The statement of the theorem follows.

Let an eigenvalue equation be solved by linearly expanding the unknown function in terms of N known functions. Let the resulting eigenvalues be ordered from the smallest (lowest), λ_{1}, to the largest (highest), λ_{N}. Let the same eigenvalue equation be solved using a basis set of dimension N + 1 that comprises the previous N functions plus an additional one. Let the resulting eigenvalues be ordered from the smallest, λ′_{1}, to the largest, λ′_{N+1}. Then, the Rayleigh theorem for eigenvalues states that λ′_{i} ≤ λ_{i} for i = 1 to N.

A subtle point about the above statement is that the smaller of the two sets of functions must be a subset of the larger one. The above inequality does not hold otherwise.

== Self-consistent calculations ==
In quantum mechanics, where the operator H is the Hamiltonian, the lowest eigenvalues are occupied (by electrons) up to the applicable number of electrons; the remaining eigenvalues, not occupied by electrons, are empty energy levels. The energy content of the Hamiltonian is the sum of the occupied eigenvalues. The Rayleigh theorem for eigenvalues is extensively utilized in calculations of electronic and related properties of materials. The electronic energies of materials are obtained through calculations said to be self-consistent, as explained below.

In density functional theory (DFT) calculations of electronic energies of materials, the eigenvalue equation, HѰ = λѰ, has a companion equation that gives the electronic charge density of the material in terms of the wave functions of the occupied energies. To be reliable, these calculations have to be self-consistent, as explained below.

The process of obtaining the electronic energies of material begins with the selection of an initial set of known functions (and related coefficients) in terms of which one expands the unknown function Ѱ . Using the known functions for the occupied states, one constructs an initial charge density for the material. For density functional theory calculations, once the charge density is known, the potential, the Hamiltonian, and the eigenvalue equation are generated. Solving this equation leads to eigenvalues (occupied or unoccupied) and their corresponding wave functions (in terms of the known functions and new coefficients of expansion). Using only the new wave functions of the occupied energies, one repeats the cycle of constructing the charge density and of generating the potential and the Hamiltonian. Then, using all the new wave functions (for occupied and empty states), one regenerates the eigenvalue equation and solves it. Each one of these cycles is called an iteration. The calculations are complete when the difference between the potentials generated in Iteration n + 1 and the one immediately preceding it (i.e., n) is 10^{−5} or less. The iterations are then said to have converged and the outcomes of the last iteration are the self-consistent results that are reliable.

== The basis set conundrum of self-consistent calculations ==
The characteristics and number of the known functions utilized in the expansion of Ѱ naturally have a bearing on the quality of the final, self-consistent results. The selection of atomic orbitals that include exponential or Gaussian functions, in additional to polynomial and angular features that apply, practically ensures the high quality of self-consistent results, except for the effects of the size and of attendant characteristics (features) of the basis set. These characteristics include the polynomial and angular functions that are inherent to the description of s, p, d, and f states for an atom. While the s functions are spherically symmetric, the others are not; they are often called polarization orbitals or functions.

The conundrum is the following. Density functional theory is for the description of the ground state of materials, i.e., the state of lowest energy. The second theorem of DFT states that the energy functional for the Hamiltonian [i.e., the energy content of the Hamiltonian] reaches its minimum value (i.e., the ground state) if the charge density employed in the calculation is that of the ground state. We described above the selection of an initial basis set in order to perform self-consistent calculations. A priori, there is no known mechanism for selecting a single basis set so that, after self consistency, the charge density it generates is that of the ground state. Self consistency with a given basis set leads to the reliable energy content of the Hamiltonian for that basis set. As per the Rayleigh theorem for eigenvalues, upon augmenting that initial basis set, the ensuing self consistent calculations lead to an energy content of the Hamiltonian that is lower than or equal to that obtained with the initial basis set. We recall that the reliable, self-consistent energy content of the Hamiltonian obtained with a basis set, after self consistency, is relative to that basis set. A larger basis set that contains the first one generally leads self consistent eigenvalues that are lower than or equal to their corresponding values from the previous calculation. One may paraphrase the issue as follows. Several basis sets of different sizes, upon the attainment of self-consistency, lead to stationary (converged) solutions. There exists an infinite number of such stationary solutions. The conundrum stems from the fact that, a priori, one has no means to determine the basis set, if any, after self consistency, leads to the ground state charge density of the material, and, according to the second DFT theorem, to the ground state energy of the material under study.

== Resolution of the basis set conundrum with the Rayleigh theorem for eigenvalues ==
Let us first recall that a self-consistent density functional theory calculation, with a single basis set, produces a stationary solution which cannot be claimed to be that of the ground state. To find the DFT ground state of a material, one has to vary the basis set (in size and attendant features) in order to minimize the energy content of the Hamiltonian, while keeping the number of particles constant. Hohenberg and Kohn, specifically stated that the energy content of the Hamiltonian "has a minimum at the 'correct' ground state Ψ, relative to arbitrary variations of Ψ′ in which the total number of particles is kept constant." Hence, the trial basis set is to be varied in order to minimize the energy. The Rayleigh theorem for eigenvalues shows how to perform such a minimization with successive augmentation of the basis set. The first trial basis set has to be a small one that accounts for all the electrons in the system. After performing a self consistent calculation (following many iterations) with this initial basis set, one augments it with one atomic orbital . Depending on the s, p, d, or f character of this orbital, the size of the new basis set (and the dimension of the Hamiltonian matrix) will be larger than that of the initial one by 2, 6, 10, or 14, respectively, taking the spin into account. Given that the initial, trial basis set was deliberately selected to be small, the resulting self consistent results cannot be assumed to describe the ground state of the material. Upon performing self-consistent calculations with the augmented basis set, one compares the occupied energies from Calculations I and II, after setting the Fermi level to zero. Invariably, the occupied energies from Calculation II are lower than or equal to their corresponding values from Calculation I. Naturally, one cannot affirm that the results from Calculation II describe the ground state of the material, given the absence of any proof that the occupied energies cannot be lowered further. Hence, one continues the process of augmenting the basis set with one orbital and of performing the next self-consistent calculation. The process is complete when three consecutive calculations yield the same occupied energies. One can affirm that the occupied energies from these three calculations represent the ground state of the material. Indeed, while two consecutive calculations can produce the same occupied energies, these energies may be for a local minimum energy content of the Hamiltonian as opposed to the absolute minimum. To have three consecutive calculations produce the same occupied energies is the robust criterion for the attainment of the ground state of a material (i.e., the state where the occupied energies have their absolute minimal values). This paragraph described how successive augmentation of the basis set solves one aspect of the conundrum, i.e., a generalized minimization of the energy content of the Hamiltonian to reach the ground state of the system under study.

Even though the paragraph above shows how the Rayleigh theorem enables the generalized minimization of the energy content of the Hamiltonian, to reach the ground state, we are still left with the fact that three different calculations produced this ground state. Let the respective numbers of these calculations be N, (N+1), and (N+2). While the occupied energies from these calculations are the same (i.e., the ground state), the unoccupied energies are not identical. Indeed, the general trend is that the unoccupied energies from the calculations are in the reverse order of the sizes of the basis sets for these calculations. In other words, for a given unoccupied eigenvalue (say the lowest one of the unoccupied energies), the result from Calculation (N+2) is smaller than or equal to that from Calculation (N+1). The latter, in turn, is smaller than or equal to the result from Calculation N. In the case of semiconductors, the lowest-laying unoccupied energies from the three calculations are generally the same, up to 6 to 10 eV or above, depending on the material, if the sizes of the basis sets of the three calculations are not vastly different. Still, for higher, unoccupied energies, the Rayleigh theorem for eigenvalues applies. This paragraph poses the question as to which one of the three, consecutive, self-consistent calculations leading to the ground state energy provides the true DFT description of the material – given the differences between some of their unoccupied energies. There are two distinct ways of determining the calculation providing the DFT description of the material.

- The first one starts by recalling that self-consistency requires the performance of iterations to obtain the reliable energy, the number of iterations may vary with the size of the basis set. With the generalized minimization made possible by the Rayleigh theorem, with successively augmented size and attendant features (i.e., polynomial and angular ones) of the basis set, the Hamiltonian changes from one calculation to the next, up to Calculation N. Calculations N + 1 and N + 2 reproduce the result from Calculation N for the occupied energies. The charge density changes from one calculation to the next, up Calculation N. Afterwards, it does not change in Calculations N + 1 and N + 2 or higher, nor does the Hamiltonian from its value in Calculation N. When the Hamiltonian does not change, a change in an unoccupied eigenvalue cannot be due to a physical interaction.. Therefore, any change of an unoccupied eigenvalue, from its value in Calculation N, is an artifact of the Rayleigh theorem for eigenvalues. Calculation N is therefore the only one that provide the DFT description of the material.
- The second way in determining the calculation that provides the DFT description of the material follows. The first DFT theorem states that the external potential is a unique functional of the charge density, except for an additive constant. The first corollary of this theorem is that the energy content of the Hamiltonian is also a unique functional of the charge density. The second corollary to the first DFT theorem is that the spectrum of the Hamiltonian is a unique functional of the charge density. Consequently, given that the charge density and the Hamiltonian do not change from their respective values in Calculation N, following an augmentation of the basis set, then any unoccupied eigenvalue, obtained in Calculations N + 1, N + 2, or higher, that is different (lower than) from its corresponding value in Calculation N, no longer belongs to the physically meaningful spectrum of the Hamiltonian, a unique functional of the charge density, given by the output of Calculation N. Hence, Calculation N is the one whose outputs possess the full, physical content of DFT; this Calculation N provides the DFT solution.

The value of the above determination of the physically meaningful calculation is that it avoids the consideration of basis sets that are larger than that of Calculation N and are heretofore over-complete for the description of the ground state of the material. In the current literature, the only calculations that have reproduced or predicted the correct, electronic properties of semiconductors have been the ones that (1) searched for and reached the true ground state of materials and (2) avoided the utilization of over complete basis sets as described above. These accurate DFT calculations did not invoke the self-interaction correction (SIC) or the derivative discontinuity employed extensively in the literature to explain the woeful underestimation of the band gaps of semiconductors and insulators. In light of the content of the two bullets above, an alternative, plausible explanation of the energy and band gap underestimation in the literature is the use of over-complete basis sets that lead to an unphysical lowering of some unoccupied energies, including some of the lowest-laying ones.
