= Sun compass in animals =

Many animals are able to navigate using the Sun as a compass. Orientation cues from the position of the Sun in the sky are combined with an indication of time from the animal's internal clock.

There is evidence that some animals can navigate using celestial cues, such as the position of the Sun. Since the Sun apparently moves in the sky, navigation by this means also requires an internal clock. Many animals depend on such a clock to maintain their circadian rhythm. Animals that use sun compass orientation are fish, birds, sea turtles, butterflies, bees, sandhoppers, reptiles, and ants.

Sun compass orientation is using the Sun's position in the sky as a directional guide. The azimuth can be used along with sun compass orientation to help animals navigate. The Sun's azimuth can be defined as the direction of a celestial object from the observer, expressed as the angular distance from the north or south point of the horizon to the point at which a vertical circle passing through the object intersects the horizon.

== Purpose of sun compass orientation ==
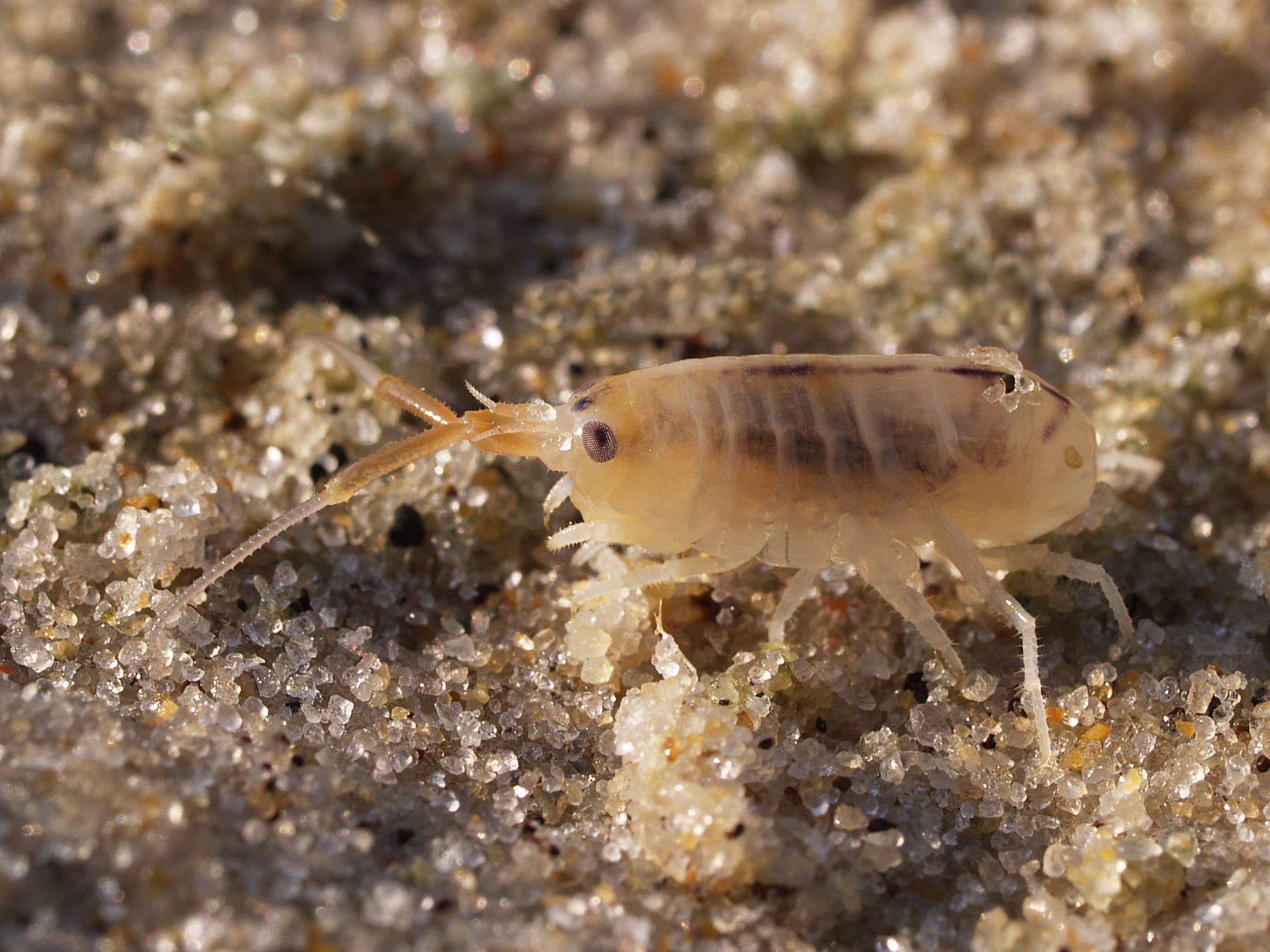
The sandhopper uses the sun and its internal clock to determine direction.

Sun compass orientation can be used as a daily guide for animals but for some, including sea turtles, they use the sun as a migratory guide. Turtles use the sun's azimuth compensation schedule in order to find their specific breeding locations each year.

Sandhoppers use the sun daily to determine where their home lays. With this experiment a group of sandhoppers were subjected to six hours of artificial lights and their movements were monitored when exposed to normal sunlight. The sandhopper's orientation when finally exposed to normal sunlight, showed that their orientation was off by 90 degrees when in respect to their home. This study helped show how an artificial light can alter the species relationship to the sun and how it can throw off the species basic directional abilities

In terms of high elevations, sun compass decreases its precision when providing information to animals. A study was performed to see if dung beetles respond better to orientations provided by the sun compass or skylight compass. The results of this study showed that dung beetles use their original bearings (i.e. sun compass) a majority of the time and rarely use skylight compass.

Fish larva find safety in the coral reefs for predators. The particular coral reef is one that the larva have been to before. The larva can recognize the area by the smell, sound, and direction of the particular reef. Fish larvae drift away from the reef and swim in order to relocate their reef. They use sun compass as one of their tools. Different cues are learned and remembered by the fish larva which allows them to return to their reef. It was also concluded that the learning process happens when the fish larvae are young and location can be memorized and become second nature. This is a useful tool that helps fish larva return to their respective reefs.

Desert ants use sun compass as a reference to the amount of walking distance to their specific destination. Ants, like bees, compensate for the sun's daily movements as it moves and rotates about the Earth. They communicate to other ants who have already been out and base their directions on the direction they should go. In addition to sun compass, insects such as ants also use a tool called azimuthal position of the sun. These are additional cues determined by ants and passed on to other ants when they communicate.

== Studies analyzing sun compass orientation ==
Sandhoppers (such as Talitrus saltator, also called sand fleas) are small shrimp-like crustaceans that live on beaches. When taken off a beach, they easily find their way back down to the sea. An experiment described by Lockley showed that this was not simply by moving downhill or towards the sight or sound of the sea. A group of sandhoppers were acclimatised to a day/night cycle under artificial lighting, whose timing was gradually changed until it was 12 hours out of phase with the natural cycle. Then, the sandhoppers were placed on the beach in natural sunlight. They moved roughly 180° from the correct direction down to the sea, up the beach. The experiment implied that the sandhoppers use the sun and their internal clock to determine their heading, and that they had learnt the actual direction down to the sea on their particular beach.

Lockley's experiments with Manx shearwaters (Puffinus puffinus) showed that when released "under a clear sky" far from their nests (in Skokholm), the seabirds first oriented themselves and then "flew off in a direct line for Skokholm", making the journey rapidly. For example, one of the birds, released at Boston airport, arrived in Skokholm 12½ days later; Lockley calculated that if the birds flew for 12 hours per day, they must have travelled at 20 miles per hour, their full normal speed, so they could not have deviated significantly from a straight line course or searched at random for their destination. The birds behaved like this regardless of whether the direct heading took the birds over sea or land. But if the sky was overcast at the time of release, the shearwaters flew around in circles "as if lost" and returned slowly or not at all. Lockley therefore concluded that it was essential for the birds that "at the moment of release the sun was visible by day, or the stars by night". Lockley did not claim to understand how the birds knew their position relative to their destination, but merely observed that they behaved as if they did know it.

A study demonstrated that monarch butterflies use the sun as a compass to guide their southwesterly autumn migration from Canada to Mexico. Migrating butterflies were captured and held for cycles of 12 hours of light and 12 of dark. One group's light began each day at 7:00 am, while the other group's began 6 hours earlier at 1:00 am. The monarchs were held in captivity for a few days and then released in a flight cage under natural daylight conditions. This allowed them to fly in the direction that they wanted to go while keeping them in the test arena. The butterflies that had their biological clocks set to the natural fall cycle (lights turned on at 7:00 am) tried to fly to the southwest, while those whose clocks had been shifted 6 hours earlier oriented 90 degrees toward the left.

The ability of birds to tune their compensation mechanisms so well to the true changes in sun azimuth suggests that the respective processes of pre-programmed learning are generating a sun azimuth/time/direction function that reflects the true sun azimuth curve very closely. It suggests that birds record the sun's direction at rather short intervals and store this information together with the information on time in their memory. A study performed testing the sun compass orientation in pigeons showed that animals must compensate for the movement of the sun with their internal clocks. The sun's azimuth plays an important role in doing so. The azimuth allows the birds to tell the time of day, and ultimately determine which direction to go for reasons such as migration or possible sources of food.

== Mechanisms ==
For some animals, the sun is a form of visual stimulus used as a tool for navigation. As seen in birds and bees, the animal will orient their body at a certain angle in relation to the sun and the time of day. This external stimuli activates a portion of the brain (in necessary for navigation and allows the organism to adjust their orientation in relation to the sun). That is to say, if the animal leaves its nest in the morning when the sun is low in the sky and plans to head in a known direction, the animal will travel in a certain direction with the sun in a position related to its body (e.g. to travel West, the sun could be on the animal's right side during navigation). This form of navigation is not as simple as observing a stimulus and acting accordingly. Studies have shown that animals may use other "tricks" like the length and direction of shadows to determine where the sun is during time shifts and then calculate the direction they should travel. For example, above the Tropic of Cancer, the sun will always be South at its zenith (highest point) so short shadows will point North. Animals tend to incorporate several types of navigation techniques, like magnetic orientation and landmarks, to their repertoire in order to perform normal navigation or to migrate.

When animals use the sun for compass orientation, they must compensate for the apparent movement of the sun with the help of their internal clock. Animals associate the sun azimuth with time of day provided by their internal clock and a reference direction provided by their magnetic compass.
