= Steven M. Reppert =

American neuroscientist (born 1946)

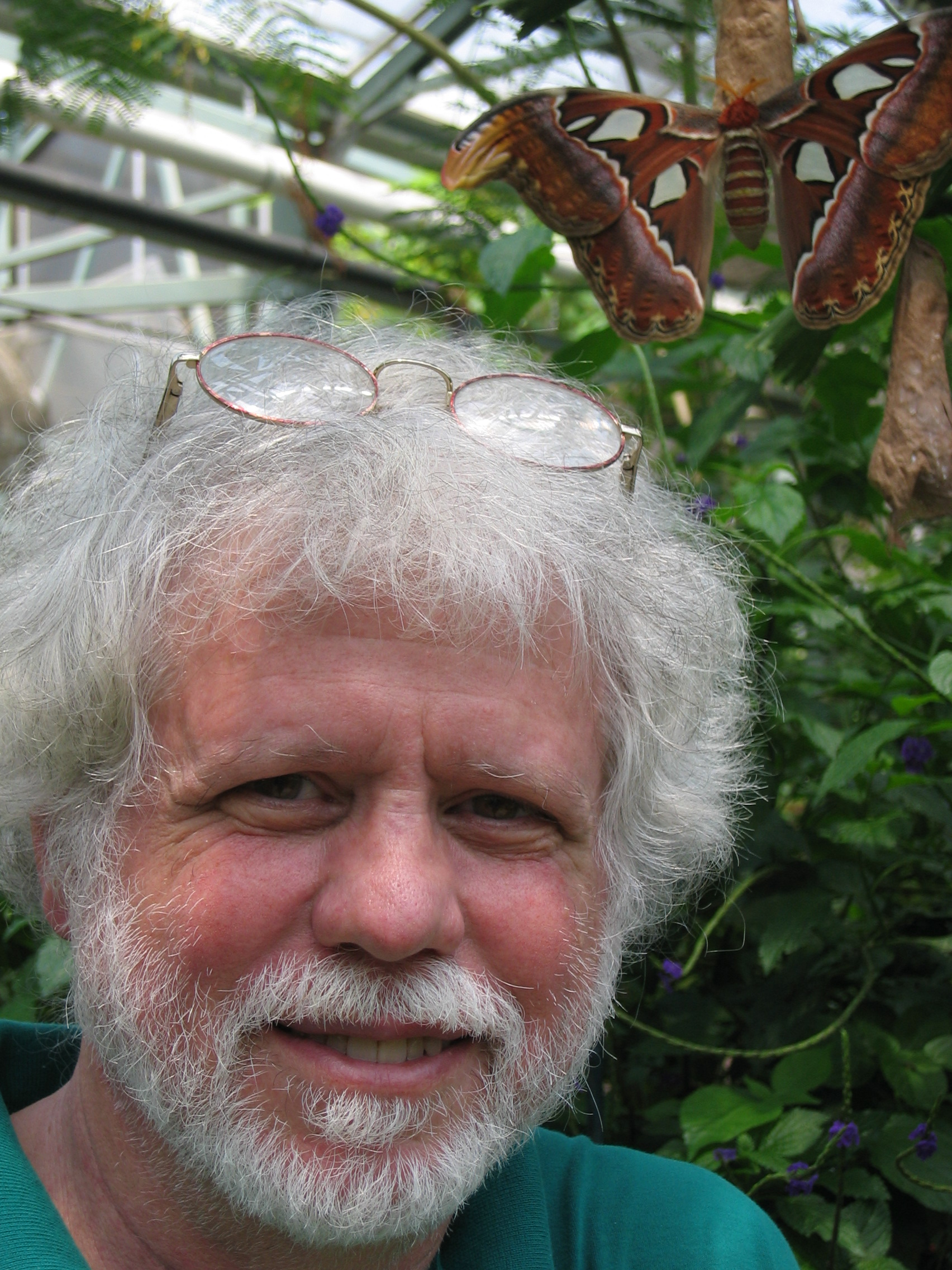
- Steven M. Reppert, American neuroscientist in Massachusetts, 2006
- Born: September 4, 1946 (age 80); Sioux City, Iowa
- Citizenship: United States
- Education: University of Nebraska, Lincoln; University of Nebraska, College of Medicine, Omaha; Harvard Medical School, Boston, Massachusetts
- Known for: Fetal circadian clock; Melatonin receptors; Circadian clock mechanism in mammals; Monarch butterfly sun compass
- Scientific career
- Fields: Chronobiology; Neuroethology
- Workplaces: Chair of the Department of Neurobiology at UMass Medical School (2001–2013); Higgins Family Professor of Neuroscience UMass Medical School (2001–2017); Distinguished Professor of Neurobiology at UMass Medical School (2014–2017); Distinguished Professor Emeritus of Neurobiology at UMass Medical School (2017–)

Steven M. Reppert (born September 4, 1946) is an American neuroscientist known for his contributions to the fields of chronobiology and neuroethology. His research has focused primarily on the physiological, cellular, and molecular basis of circadian rhythms in mammals and more recently on the navigational mechanisms of migratory monarch butterflies. He was the Higgins Family Professor of Neuroscience at the University of Massachusetts Medical School from 2001 to 2017, and from 2001 to 2013 was the founding chair of the Department of Neurobiology. Reppert stepped down as chair in 2014. He is currently distinguished professor emeritus of neurobiology.

== Biography ==
=== Early life ===
Steven Reppert grew up in the village of Pender, Nebraska, and graduated from Pender Public High School in 1964. His interest in science began in childhood with the cecropia moth—an insect made famous by Harvard biologist Carroll M. Williams, who used the moth in his pioneering work on the role of juvenile hormone in molting and metamorphosis. Reppert continues to rear cecropia from egg to adult each summer.

=== Education and career ===
Reppert received his BS and MD in 1973 (with distinction) from the University of Nebraska College of Medicine and was elected as a medical student to the Alpha Omega Alpha Honor Medical Society.

From 1973 to 1976, he did an internship and residency in pediatrics at the Massachusetts General Hospital.

From 1976 to 1979, Reppert was a postdoctoral fellow in neuroendocrinology at the National Institute of Child Health and Human Development in Bethesda, Maryland, in David C. Klein's laboratory, which focuses on the pineal gland and circadian biology.

Reppert was on the faculty at the Massachusetts General Hospital and Harvard Medical School beginning in 1979 and was promoted to professor in 1993; he directed the Laboratory of Developmental Chronobiology at the Massachusetts General Hospital from 1983 to 2001, when he moved to the University of Massachusetts Medical School.

== Research ==
Reppert has published more than 180 papers. He is the principal inventor on seven patents derived from his research.

=== Fetal circadian clocks ===
Rodent studies have shown that the master brain clock in the suprachiasmatic nucleus (SCN) is functional in the fetus before the fetal brain is capable of registering the presence of light. Reppert and colleagues reported that the fetal SCN is entrained to the light-dark cycle before the retinohypothalamic pathway innervates the SCN from the eye. This finding indicates that the mother, and her entrainment to ambient light-dark cycles, provides the necessary information to the fetus for synchronization. As Reppert states, “Mom is functioning as the transducer for the fetal circadian system. She takes in light information to her circadian system, and then that is communicated to the fetal circadian system.” This fetal entrainment persists into the postnatal period and ensures that neonatal behavioral patterns are properly tuned with the environment. Dopamine and melatonin can both act as perinatal maternal entraining signals.

=== Mammalian circadian clocks ===
Steven Reppert and colleagues have made seminal contributions that provide insight into the mammalian circadian clock mechanism.

==== Cell autonomy in the SCN ====
Reppert and colleagues discovered that the SCN contains a large population of autonomous, single-cell circadian oscillators. They cultured cells from neonatal rat SCN on fixed microelectrode array that allowed them to monitor individual SCN neuron activity in culture. Circadian rhythms expressed by neurons in the same culture were not synchronized, indicating that they functioned independently of one another.

==== Functions of mouse clock genes: PERIOD2 and PERIOD3 ====
Reppert and coworkers also discovered the mouse clock genes mPer2 and mPer3 and defined their functions. They found that the mPER2 and mPER3 proteins, as well as the previously discovered mPER1, share several regions of homology with one another and with Drosophila PER. Reppert and coworkers found different light responses among the three Per genes. Unlike mPer1 and mPer2 mRNA levels, mPer3 mRNA levels are not acutely altered by light exposure during the subjective night. They also found that mPer1–3 are widely expressed in tissues outside the brain, including the liver, skeletal muscles, and testis. To determine the function of mPER1–3, Reppert and colleagues disrupted the three genes encoding them. Using double-mutant mice, they showed that mPER3 functions outside the core circadian clockwork, whereas both mPER1 and mPER2 are necessary for rhythmicity.

==== Negative transcriptional feedback loop ====
Reppert and colleagues discovered that the two mouse cryptochromes, mCRY1 and mCRY2, function as the primary transcriptional repressors of clock gene expression, and the mPER proteins are necessary for CRY nuclear translocation. This work provided the first portrayal of a negative transcriptional feedback loop as the major gear driving the mouse molecular clock.

==== Interlocking transcriptional feedback loops ====
Reppert and colleagues found that the core mechanisms for the SCN in mammals consist of interacting positive and negative transcriptional feedback loops. The first loop is an autoregulatory negative transcriptional feedback loop in which the mCRY proteins negatively regulate mCry and mPer gene transcription. The second interlocking feedback loop involves the rhythmic regulation of Bmal1. Rhythmicity of Bmal1 is not necessary for clockwork function, but it helps modulate the robustness of rhythmicity.

==== CLOCK and NPAS2 ====
Reppert and colleagues discovered that the transcription factors CLOCK and NPAS2 have overlapping roles in the SCN, revealing a new and unexpected role for NPAS2. His lab observed that CLOCK-deficient mice continue to have behavioral and molecular rhythms, which showed that CLOCK is not essential for circadian rhythm in locomotor activity in mice. They then determined, by investigating CLOCK-deficient mice, that NPAS2 is a paralog of CLOCK and can functionally substitute CLOCK by dimerizing with BMAL1. Finally, they found—by investigating CLOCK-deficient, NPAS2-deficient, and double-mutant mice—that circadian rhythms in peripheral oscillators require CLOCK. Thus, there is a fundamental difference between CLOCK and NPAS2 that is tissue dependent.

=== Mammalian melatonin receptors ===
In 1994, Reppert cloned human and sheep Mel_{1a} melatonin receptor, the first in a family of GPCRs that bind the pineal hormone melatonin, and localized its expression in the mammalian brain to the SCN and the hypophyseal pars tuberalis. Mel_{1a} is believed to be responsible for the circadian effects of melatonin and the reproductive actions in seasonal breeding mammals.

In 1995, Reppert cloned and characterized the Mel_{1b} melatonin receptor. He and colleagues found that the receptor was predominantly expressed in the retina, where it is believed to modify light-dependent retinal functions. They identified outbred populations of Siberian hamsters that lacked functional Mel_{1b} but maintained circadian and reproductive responses to melatonin; these data indicate that Mel_{1b} is not necessary for the circadian and reproductive actions of melatonin, which instead depend on Mel_{1a}.

Elucidation of the molecular nature of the melatonin receptors has facilitated definition of their ligand-binding characteristics and aided the development of melatonin analogs that are now used to treat sleep disorders and depression.

=== Insect cryptochromes ===
In 2003, Reppert began investigating the functional and evolutionary properties of the CRY protein in the monarch butterfly. He identified two Cry genes in the monarch, Cry1 and Cry2. His work demonstrated that the monarch CRY1 protein is functionally analogous to Drosophila CRY, the blue-light photoreceptor necessary for photoentrainment in the fly. He also demonstrated that monarch CRY2 is functionally analogous to vertebrate CRYs and that monarch CRY2 acts as a potent transcriptional repressor in the circadian clock transcriptional translation feedback loop of the butterfly, as his group previously showed for the two mouse CRYs. These data propose the existence of a novel circadian clock unique to some non-drosophilid insects that possesses mechanisms characteristic of both the Drosophila and the mammalian clocks. Other insects, such as bees and ants, possess only a vertebrate-like CRY, and their circadian clocks are even more vertebrate like. Drosophila is the only known insect that does not possess a vertebrate-like CRY.

In 2008, Reppert and colleagues discovered the necessity of CRY for light-dependent magnetoreception responses in Drosophila. They also showed that magnetoreception requires UVA/blue light, the spectrum corresponding with the action spectrum of Drosophila CRY. These data were the first to genetically implicate CRY as a component of the input pathway or the chemical-based pathway of magnetoreception. Applying these findings to his work with the monarch, Reppert’s group showed that both monarch CRY1 and CRY2 proteins, when expressed as a transgene in CRY-deficient flies, successfully restore light-dependent magnetosensitivity function. These results propose the presence of a CRY-mediated magnetosensitivity system in monarchs that may act in concordance with the sun compass to aid navigation. In 2011, Reppert's lab also discovered that human CRY2 can substitute as a functional magnetoreceptor in CRY-deficient flies, a discovery that warrants additional research into magnetosensitivity in humans. However, interpretation of the above CRY-dependent magnet work needs to be viewed in the context of a paper by Bassetto et al. 2023 that suggests that there is no evidence for magnetic field effects on behaviour in Drosophila. Moreover, the authors could not reproduce magnetosensitivity in Drosophila using the binary T-maze apparatus developed in Reppert’s lab. Reppert defends the work from his lab showing fruit fly magnetosensitivity and questions the conclusions reported in Bassetto et al., 2023. Further work is needed to refute or verify the proposed lack of magnetoreception in Drosophila.

=== Monarch butterfly migration ===
Since 2002, Reppert and coworkers have pioneered the study of the biological basis of monarch butterfly migration. Each fall, millions of monarchs from the eastern United States and southeastern Canada migrate as much as 4,000 km to overwinter in roosts in Central Mexico. Monarch migration is not a learned activity, given that migrants flying south are at least two generations removed from the previous year's migrants. Thus, migrating monarchs must have some genetically based navigational mechanism.

Reppert and colleagues have focused on a novel circadian clock mechanism and its role in time-compensated sun compass orientation, a major navigational strategy that butterflies use during their fall migration. Using clock-shift experiments, they showed that the circadian clock must interact with the sun compass to enable migrants to maintain a southerly flight direction as the sun moves daily across the sky. Reppert collaborated with Eli Shlizerman at the University of Washington and Daniel Forger at the University of Michigan to propose a working mathematical model of the time-compensated sun compass.

==== Clockwork mechanism ====
The monarch clockwork model, which has both Drosophila-like and mammal-like aspects, is unique because it employs two distinct CRY proteins. As presented in a review article, the clock mechanism, on a gene/protein level, operates as follows:

- In an autoregulatory transcriptional feedback loop, heterodimers of CLOCK (CLK) and CYCLE (CYC) form and drive the transcription of the Per, Tim, and Cry2 genes.
- TIM, PER, and CRY2 proteins are translated and form complexes in the cytoplasm.
- 24 hours later, CRY2 returns to the nucleus and inhibits CLK:CYC transcription.
- Meanwhile, PER is progressively phosphorylated, which may aid CRY2 translocation into the nucleus.
- CRY1 protein is a circadian photoreceptor that, when exposed to light, causes TIM degradation, allowing light to gain access to the central clock mechanism for photic entrainment.

==== Antennal clocks ====
Reppert’s lab expanded upon Fred Urquhart's postulation that antennae play a role in monarch migration. In 2009 Reppert and coworkers Christine Merlin and Robert Gegear reported that, despite previous assumptions that the time-compensation clocks are located exclusively in the brain, there are also clocks located in the antennae, which "are necessary for proper time-compensated sun compass orientation in migratory monarch butterflies.” They concluded this by comparing the sun compass orientation of monarch migrants with intact antennae and those whose antennae had been removed. Reppert's lab also studied antennae in vitro and found that antennal clocks can be directly entrained by light and can function independently from the brain. Further research is needed, however, on the interaction between the circadian clocks in monarch butterfly's antennae and the sun compass in the brain.

In 2012, Reppert and colleagues determined that only a single antenna is sufficient for sun compass orientation. They did so by painting one antenna black to cause discordant light exposure between the two antennae; the single not-painted antenna was sufficient for orientation. All four clock genes (per, tim, cry1, and cry2) were expressed in the various studied areas of the antenna, suggesting that "light entrained circadian clocks are distributed throughout the length of the monarch butterfly antenna."

In 2013, Reppert and Patrick Guerra showed that spring remigrants also use an antenna-dependent time-compensated sun compass to direct their northward flight from Mexico to the southern United States.

==== Sun compass ====
Using anatomical and electrophysiological studies of the monarch butterfly brain, Stanley Heinze working in Reppert’s lab provided evidence that the central complex, a midline structure in the central brain, is likely the site of the sun compass.

==== Magnetic compass ====
Reppert and colleagues Patrick Guerra and Robert Gegear showed that migratory monarchs can use a light-dependent, inclination-based, magnetic compass for navigation on overcast days. Genetic studies from Christine Merlin’s laboratory show that the photoreceptive CRY1 protein is essential for the monarch’s light-sensitive magnetic compass. The successful use of reverse genetics in monarchs would indicate that the butterfly is an excellent choice for helping to delineate the molecular mechanism underlying light-dependent magnetosensing in the context of compass navigation.

==== Temperature ====
Reppert and Patrick Guerra showed that fall migrants prematurely exposed to overwintering-like coldness reverse their flight orientation to the north. The temperature microenvironment at the overwintering site is essential for successful completion of the migration cycle: without cold exposure, aged migrants continue to orient to the south. The discovery that coldness triggers the northward flight direction in spring remigrants underscores how vulnerable the migration may be to climate change.

==== Monarch butterfly genome ====
In 2011, Reppert and colleagues presented the draft sequence of the monarch butterfly genome and a set 16,866 protein-coding genes. This is the first characterized genome of a butterfly and of a long-distance migratory species.

In 2012, Reppert and colleagues established MonarchBase, an integrated database for the genome of Danaus plexippus. The goal of the project was to make genomic and proteomic information about monarch butterflies accessible to biological and lepidopteran communities.

In 2013, Christine Merlin and Scot Wolfe developed in Reppert’s lab a novel gene-targeting approach in monarchs that uses a zinc finger nuclease strategy to define the essential nature of CRY2 for clockwork function in lepidopterans. Targeted mutagenesis of Cry2 indeed resulted in the in vivo disruption of circadian behavior and the molecular clock mechanism. Further work in Merlin’s lab has shown that nuclease strategies are powerful tools for targeting additional clock genes in monarchs and altering gene function.

In 2016, Reppert collaborated with Marcus Kronforst at the University of Chicago and others to use population genetic studies to define the evolutionary history of the monarch migration.

== Awards and honors ==
- Charles King Trust Research Fellowship, 1981–1984
- Basil O'Connor Starter Scholar Research Award, March of Dimes Fund, 1981–1983
- Established Investigator Award of the American Heart Association, 1985–1990
- Fellow, American Society for Clinical Investigation, elected 1987
- E. Mead Johnson Award for Outstanding Research, 1989
- NIH-NICHD MERIT Award, 1992–2002
- Honorary master's degree, Harvard University, 1993
- Higgins Family Professor of Neuroscience, University of Massachusetts Medical School, 2001–2017
- President, Society for Research on Biological Rhythms, 2004
- Fellow of the American Association for the Advancement of Science, elected 2011
- Gregor J. Mendel Honorary Medal for Merit in the Biological Sciences from the Academy of Sciences of the Czech Republic, 2012
- Honorary doctorate, University of South Bohemia, Czech Republic, 2013
- Chancellor’s Medal for Distinguished Scholarship, University of Massachusetts Medical School, 2016
