= Windesheim Honours College =

Coordinates: 52.4994°N 6.0800°E

Windesheim Honours College (Zwolle, Netherlands) is an initiative of Windesheim University of Applied Sciences and VU University Amsterdam. The college offers an international and English-language Bachelor's degree programme, for students who aspire a future career as international project managers or consultants.

Global Project and Change Management (GPCM) is a four-year English-taught Bachelor of Business Administration (BBA) programme offered by Windesheim Honours College in Zwolle, the Netherlands. This honours programme is designed to prepare students for roles as resilient international project managers and leaders in change. Students learn through the context of professional projects with real clients, as well as via internships, industrial visits, guest lectures from alumni, and interaction with a network of industry experts. The United Nations' 17 Sustainable Development Goals (SDGs) form an integral part of the programme; students work with these goals to develop academic, personal and professional expertise intended to fortify them as they meet a range of pressing global sustainability challenges, including climate change, resource depletion, human rights violations, health disparities, gender inequality, migration, poverty reduction, and ocean pollution.

== Windesheim Honours College offers ==
- a full time BBA programme (English taught) Global Project and Change Management with distinctive features: honours, small scale and intensive
- 3 Windesheim (Dutch) honours programmes
- 1 talent programme (Dutch)

== Campus ==
Windesheim Honours College is a residential college in the city of Zwolle.

== Windesheim University of Applied Sciences ==
Windesheim Honours College is part of Windesheim University of Applied Sciences.
