= Serge Daan =

Dutch scientist (1940–2018)

- Born: 11 June 1940; Mook, Netherlands
- Died: 9 February 2018 (aged 77); Paterswolde, Netherlands
- Known for: Chronobiology
- Awards: International Prize for Biology (2006)
- Scientific career
- Fields: Chronobiology
- Workplaces: University of Groningen

Serge Daan (11 June 1940 – 9 February 2018) was a Dutch scientist, known for his significant contributions to the field of Chronobiology.

== Early life and education ==
Serge Daan (Mook, 1940) was born in a wind mill, grew up in the Dutch countryside, and went to high school (Gymnasium β) in Deventer. The Daan family was highly interested in biology and undertook enterprises in this field, such as investigating the ecology of reptiles in the Mediterranean area. As a consequence of this interest, Serge studied biology at the University of Amsterdam.

== Academic career ==
In September 1973, Serge received his Ph.D. in Amsterdam (cum laude) with a thesis on hibernation. He was subsequently trained as a postdoc by the two founders of modern chronobiology, Jürgen Aschoff and Colin Pittendrigh. This four-year episode, at the Max Planck Institute for Behavioral Physiology in Andechs, Bavaria and Stanford University in California, and the lifelong collaboration and friendship with both were crucial for his professional career. In 1975, Daan was appointed associate professor at the University of Groningen in the Animal Ecology group of R.H. Drent. In 1994 he became Extra-ordinarius in Chronobiology, and in 1996 Professor of Ethology. Since 2003 he has occupied the prestigious Niko Tinbergen chair in Behavioral Biology.

=== Research ===
Academy building of the University of Groningen

Serge Daan’s research focuses on the temporal organisation of behaviour in animals and humans. In about 250 publications he contributed a number of key concepts and models that have improved understanding of the ‘circadian’ (circa 24-h) rhythms of rest and activity, the regulation of human sleep, and the annual timing of reproduction.

==== Circadian rhythms ====
Working with Pittendrigh, Daan developed many of the theoretical foundations for understanding the dynamics of circadian oscillators. Many other studies have followed, shifting the focus from behavioural black box models to testable hypotheses about underlying molecular mechanisms.

==== Regulation of human sleep ====
Work on circadian rhythms by others in the field culminated in the notion that a single circadian pacemaker exists to keep track of environmental time, while at the same time controlling downstream oscillations in physiology and behaviour. However, this notion was inconsistent with observations of the timing of sleep in human subjects living in isolation from time cues. Serge Daan, together with Borbély and Beersma, developed a model which convincingly explained the observations. It was called the two-process model of sleep regulation and explained human sleep regulation in terms of two key processes: a circadian pacemaker, and a homeostatic drive to sleep that increases during wake and decreases during sleep. Today, the two process model is used as the basis for most predictive models of sleep and performance.

==== Annual timing of reproduction ====
Apart from daily alternations in the environment, there are substantial seasonal variations that animals must adapt to across the year. Working with Drent, Daan showed that one strategy used to deal with seasonal changes is to adjust the number and even sex of offspring.

=== Organisation ===
Serge Daan held many offices in academia. He was member of the board of Earth and Life Sciences of NWO – the Netherlands Organisation for Scientific Research (1997–2002), and chairman of the NWO program Evolution and Behaviour (2002–2009). He was president of the Dutch Society for Behavioural Biology (1996–2001). From 2001 to 2004 he was vice-dean for research at the Faculty of Mathematics and Natural Sciences of the University of Groningen, and together with dean D.A. Wiersma was responsible for incisive changes such as the tenure track system and the Rosalind Franklin fellowships for women. From 2007 till 2009 he was dean of this Faculty.

=== Teaching ===
Serge Daan taught a wide array of courses on all levels of the curriculum of Biology (animal ecology, zoology, human ethology, chronobiology, animal behaviour, evolution), including the recent tutorial Honours College for highly talented students. He supervised more than 200 master students during their research projects. Serge Daan took the initiative to set up and coordinate the top-master program in Behavioural and Cognitive Neurosciences at the University of Groningen, the Netherlands.

=== Ph.D.s supervised ===
Daan has supervised 43 Ph.D. students.

1986 D. Masman: The annual cycle of the kestrel, Falco tinnunculus. A study in behavioural energetics.

1988 C. Dijkstra: Reproductive tactics in the Kestrel, Falco tinnunculus. A study in evolutionary biology.

1988 T. Meijer: Reproductive decisions in the Kestrel, Falco tinnunculus. A study in physiological ecology.

1988 D.J. Dijk: Spectral analysis of the sleep EEG. Experiments inspired by the two-process model of sleep regulation. (cum laude)

1989 J.H. Meijer: Neuropharmacological and photic manipulation of the circadian pacemaker.

1991 M.P. Gerkema: Ultradian and circadian oscillators in the temporal organization of behaviour in voles.

1993 P.C.J. Franken: Sleep homeostasis and brain temperature. Experimental and simulation studies in the rat.

1995 S. Verhulst: Reproductive decisions in the Great Tit: An optimality approach. (cum laude)

1995 M.W.G. Brinkhof: Timing of reproduction. An experimental study in coots.

1996 C. Deerenberg: Parental energy and fitness costs in birds.

1996 T. de Boer: Sleep regulation in the Djungarian hamster. The effects of temperature, photoperiod and daily torpor.

1997 P.M. Meerlo: Behavioural and chronobiological consequences of social stress in rats.

1997 K.C. de Kogel: Long-term effects of brood size on offspring. An experimental study in the Zebrafinch.

1999 A.M. Strijkstra: Periodic euthermy during hibernation in the European ground squirrel: causes and consequences.

1999 P.E. Boon: Daylength and growth: Behaviour, energy balance and protein synthesis.

1999 M.J.H. Kas: Sleep and circadian timekeeping in Octodon degus.

2000 I.R. Pen: Sex allocation in a life history context. (cum laude)

2001 R.A. Hut: Natural entrainment of circadian systems. A study in the diurnal ground squirrel Spermophilus citellus.

2001 K. Jansen: Circadian rhythms in pacemaker and behavior. (a study in the Common vole, Microtus arvalis)

2001 M. Oklejewicz: The rate of living in tau mutant Syrian hamsters. Studies on the impact of a circadian allele on temporal organisation.

2002 B.I. Tieleman: Avian adaptation along an aridity gradient. Physiology, behavior, and life history. (cum laude)

2003 C. Carere: Personality as an epigenetic suite of traits. A study on a passerine bird.

2003 B. Riedstra: Development and social nature of feather pecking.

2003 B.A.M. Biemans: A time to remember. Consequences of ageing on the circadian memory modulation in rodents.

2004 C.M. Eising: Mother knows best? Costs and benefits of differential hormone allocation in birds.

2004 W. Müller: Maternal phenotypic engineering. Adaptation and constraint in prenatal maternal effects.

2004 N.B. Baron von Engelhardt: Proximate control in avian sex allocation - a study in zebra finches.

2005 M. Rüger: Lighting up the human clock: Effects of bright light on physiological and psychological states in humans.

2005 K. Spoelstra: Dawn and Dusk. Behavioural and molecular complexity in circadian entrainment.

2005 S. Engel: Racing the wind. Water economy and energy expenditure in avian endurance flight.

2006 P.D. Dijkstra: Know thine enemy. Intrasexual selection and sympatric speciation in a Lake Victoria cichlid fish.

2006 P. Korsten: Avian sex allocation and ornamental coloration. A study on blue tits.

2007 C. Schmidt-Wellenburg: Costs of migration. Short- and long-term consequences of avian endurance flight.

2007 L.M. Vaanholt: The rate of living in mice. Impacts of activity and temperature on energy metabolism and longevity.

2007 A. Zavada: Defining and determining the properties of the human sleep homeostat.

2007 D. van der Veen: Neural substrate and the timing of behaviour in a multiple clock system.

2009 T. Limbourg: Parental care in relation to offspring sex and mate attractiveness in the Blue tit.

2009 R.H.E. Mullers: The commuting parent. Energetic constraints in a long distance forager, the Cape gannet.

2009 K.A. Schubert: Breeding on a budget. Fundamental links between energy metabolism and mammalian life history trade-offs. (cum laude)

2009 M.A. Comas Soberats: Entrainment to daylength in the mouse circadian system. Behavioural and molecular analyses. (cum laude)

Honorary doctorate:

2009 Michael Menaker, University of Virginia

=== Laudakia stellio daani ===
A subspecies of lizard found on some Greek Aegean islands and Turkish Anatolia, Laudakia stellio daani, is named after S. Daan. The subspecies differs from the nominotypical subspecies (L. stellio stellio) by having a black-gray head instead of yellowish or reddish head color. This difference was noted by Serge Daan during his investigations in the Mediterranean area, and reported in a paper in 1967.

== Social gatherings ==
Serge Daan and his wife Ruth Hohe-Daan are well known for their hospitality within the scientific community. Throughout the years, many biologists have stayed in their house ‘villa Later’ in Paterswolde.

Serge and Ruth are also well known for organising a yearly summer garden party for the people working in the lab.

== Honors and awards ==
1967 UNIVERSITY OF AMSTERDAM: The annual student award, for a study on: Lateral undulations in the spinal cord in lizard locomotion

1980 Laudakia stellio daani, a Greek and Turkish lizard, named after S.Daan by A.Beutler, E. Frør, Mitt. Zool. Ges. Braunau 3: 255-290

1992 ALEXANDER VON HUMBOLDT Forschungspreis (Research Prize) (Germany)

2000 ROYAL SOCIETY of CANADA, elected Foreign Fellow

2002 Recipient of “Aschoff's Rule”, meeting of the Society for Research on Biological Rhythms, Amelia Island (Fa, USA). Many chronobiologists will envy Serge for this prize. It is the ruler that was owned by Jürgen Aschoff, one of the fathers of modern chronobiology. The ruler is awarded each time by the previous winner to a new winner, who is selected because he or she is doing chronobiological research with a different technique in a different species than the previous winner. The names of the winners are listed on the back of the ruler.

2003 Appointed as Niko Tinbergen Distinguished Professor in Behavioural Biology

2005 Ridder in de Orde van de Nederlandse Leeuw (Knight in the Order of the Dutch Lion)

2006 INTERNATIONAL PRIZE FOR BIOLOGY (Japan Society for the Promotion of Science). Without doubt, this is the most prestigious prize Serge Daan obtained. Many biologists consider this prize to be the highest international award in Biology. For Serge Daan, the fact that this prize introduced him to the royal family of Japan represents a special dimension.

2008 Eminent Scientist Award (Japan Society for the Promotion of Science)
