= Borbély =

Borbély (Hungarian pronunciation: [ˈborbeːj], "barber") is a Hungarian surname. Notable people with this name include:

- Alexander Borbély (born 1939), Hungarian-born Swiss scientist working in sleep research
- Balázs Borbély (born 1979), Slovak footballer of Hungarian ethnicity
- Csaba Borbély (born 1980), Romanian professional football player of Hungarian ethnicity
- László Borbély (born 1954), Romanian economist and politician of Hungarian ethnicity
- Zsanett Borbély (born 1978), Hungarian handball player
