= Zwolle =

- City and municipality
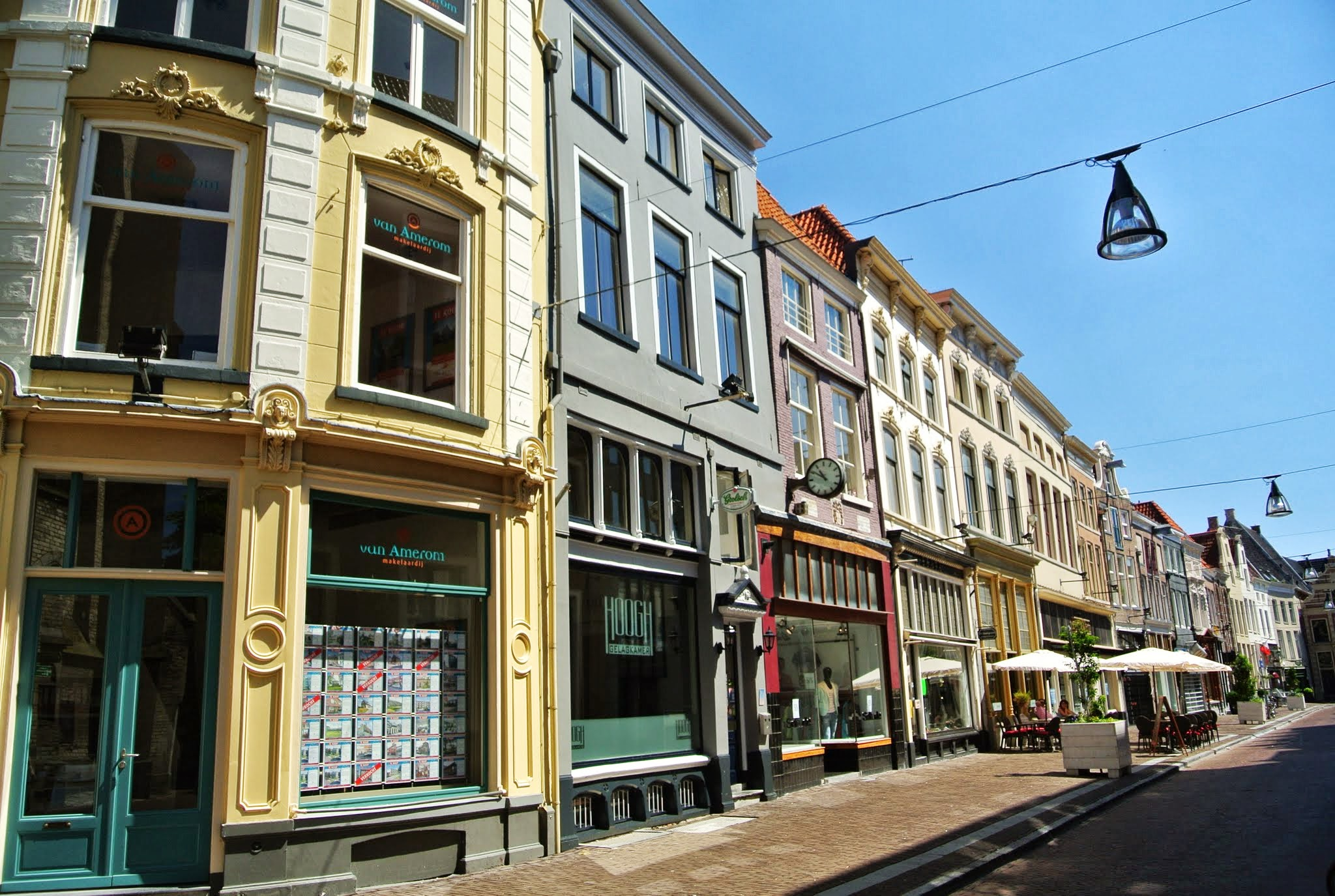
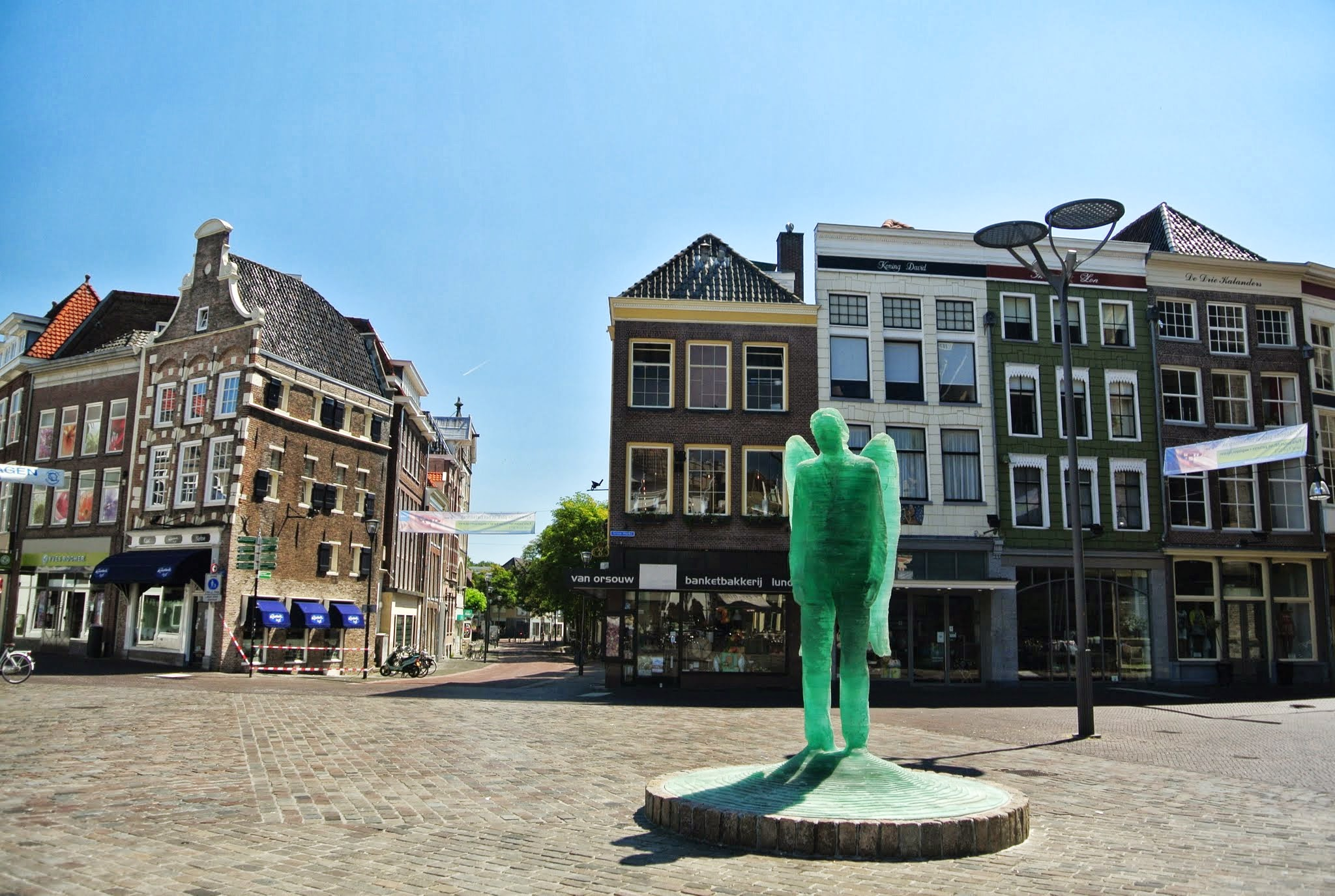
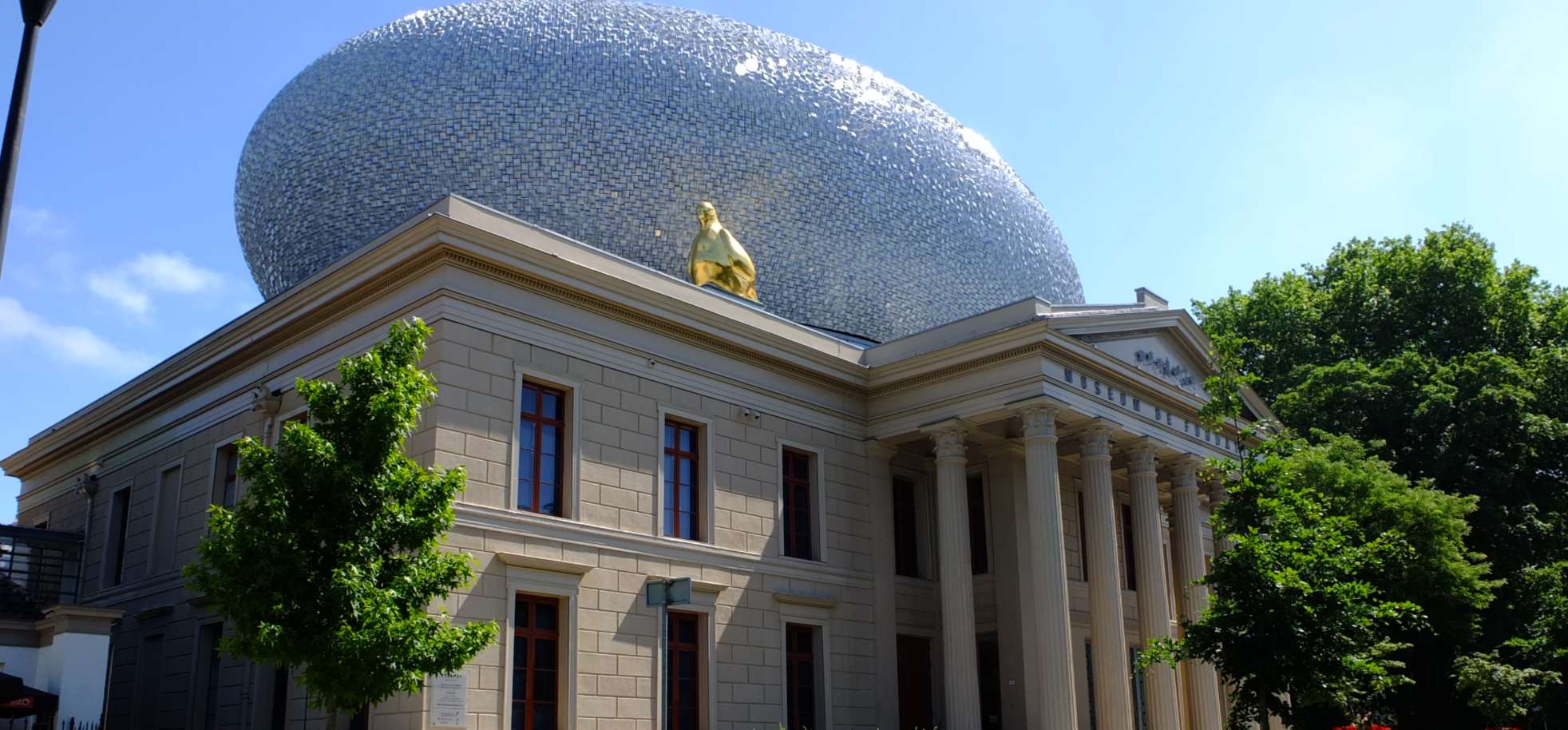
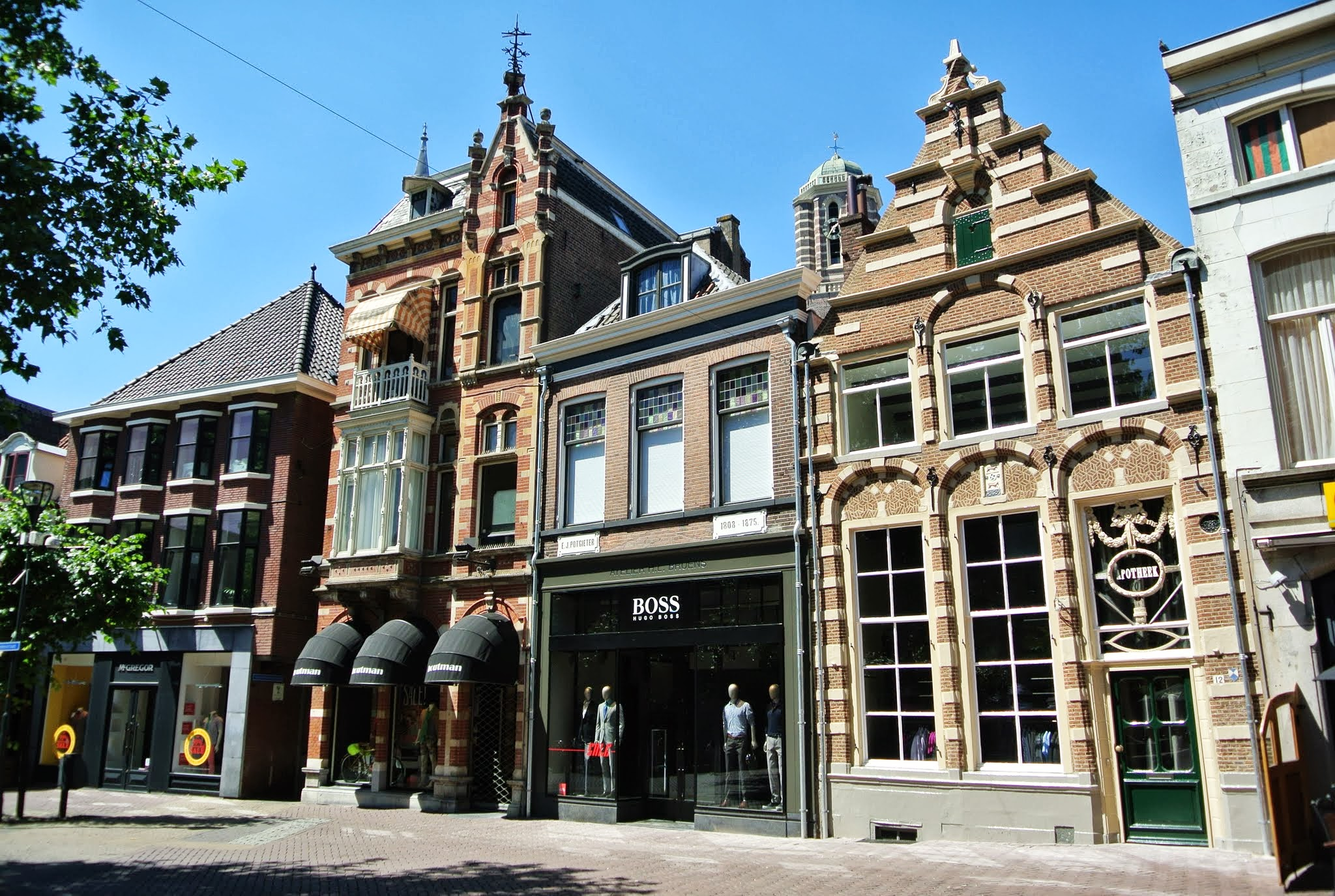
- Sassenstraat Grote Markt Museum de Fundatie Luttekestraat Binnenstad

- Flag Coat of arms Brandmark

- Location in Overijssel
- Interactive map of Zwolle
- Location within the Netherlands Location within Europe
- Coordinates: 52°31′N 6°6′E
- Country: Netherlands
- Province: Overijssel

Government
  - Body: Municipal council
  - Mayor: Peter Snijders (VVD)

Area
  - Municipality: 119.36 km^{2} (46.09 sq mi)
  - Land: 111.10 km^{2} (42.90 sq mi)
  - Water: 8.26 km^{2} (3.19 sq mi)
- Elevation: 4 m (13 ft)

Population (Municipality, January 2021; Urban and Metro, May 2014)
  - Municipality: 129,840
  - Density: 1,169/km^{2} (3,030/sq mi)
  - Urban: 123,507
  - Metro: 181,440
- Demonym: Zwollenaar
- Time zone: UTC+1 (CET)
  - Summer (DST): UTC+2 (CEST)
- Postcode: 8000–8049
- Area code: 038
- Website: www.zwolle.nl

Zwolle (Dutch: [ˈzʋɔlə]) is a city and municipality in the Northeastern Netherlands. It is the capital of the province of Overijssel and the province's second-largest municipality, after Enschede, and has a population of 132,441 as of December 2023. Zwolle borders the province of Gelderland and lies on the eastern side of the River IJssel.

== History ==
Historical population
Year	Pop.	±% p.a.
1404	3,500	—
1525	4,500	+0.21%
1599	6,500	+0.50%
1628	7,700	+0.59%
1670	10,932	+0.84%
1675	6,963	−8.63%
1680	9,388	+6.16%
1682	7,800	−8.85%
1748	11,931	+0.65%
1795	12,220	+0.05%
Source: Lourens & Lucassen 1997, pp. 83–84

Archaeological findings indicate that the area surrounding Zwolle has been inhabited since ancient times. A woodhenge found in the Zwolle-Zuid suburb in 1993 was dated to the Bronze Age period. During the Roman era, the area was inhabited by Salian Franks.

The modern city was founded around 800 CE by Frisian merchants and troops of Charlemagne. Previous spellings of its name include the identically pronounced Suolle, which means "hill" (cf. the English cognate verb "to swell"). This refers to an incline in the landscape between the four rivers surrounding the city, IJssel, Vecht, Aa and Zwarte Water. The hill was the only piece of land that would remain dry during the frequent floodings of the rivers. Zwolle was established on that incline.

A document mentions the existence of a parish church dedicated to St Michael. That church, the Grote of Sint Michaëlskerk (St. Michael's church), was renovated in the first half of the 15th century and exists to this day. The church contains a richly carved pulpit, the work of Adam Straes van Weilborch (about 1620), some good carving, and an exquisite Baroque organ from 1721 designed by master organ builder Arp Schnitger and completed by his sons Franz Caspar and Johann Georg.

On 31 August 1230, the bishop of Utrecht granted Zwolle city rights. Zwolle became a member of the Hanseatic league in 1294, and in 1361 joined the war between the Hanseatic League and Valdemar IV of Denmark. In the 1370 Treaty of Stralsund that ended the war, Zwolle was awarded a vitte, a trade colony, in Scania, then part of Denmark. Zwolle's golden age came in the 15th century. Between 1402 and 1450, the city's Gross Regional Product multiplied by about six.

In July 1324 and October 1361, regional noblemen set fire to Zwolle. In the 1324 fire, only nine buildings escaped the flames.

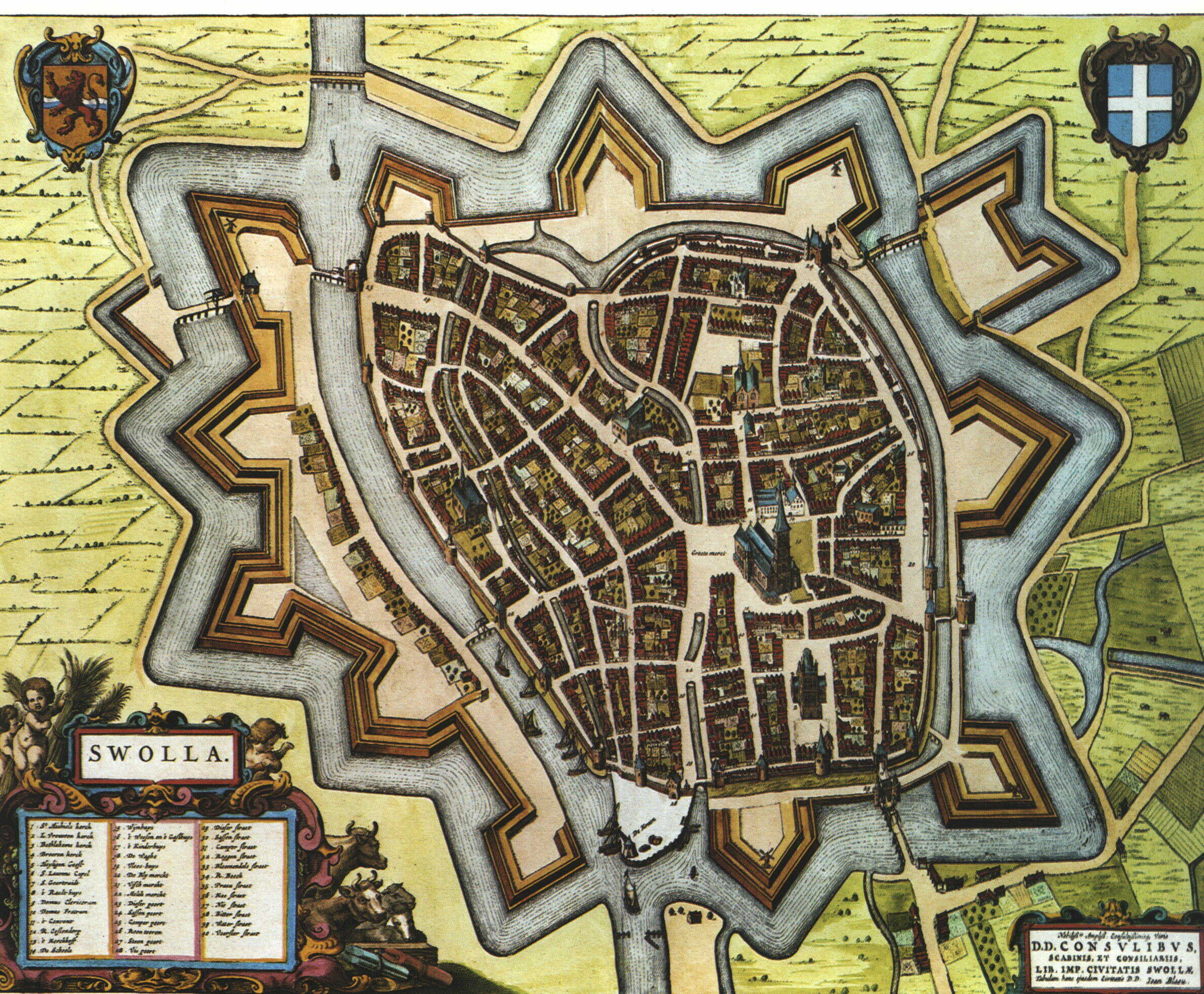
Map of Zwolle by Joan Blaeu in Blaeu's "Toonneel der Steden", 1652

Zwolle was also, with Deventer, one of the centers of the Brethren of the Common Life, a monastic movement. 5 km (3 mi) from Zwolle, on a slight eminence called the Agnietenberg (hill of St Agnes), once stood the Augustinian convent in which Thomas à Kempis spent the greatest part of his life and died (in 1471).

At least as early as 1911, Zwolle had a considerable trade by river, a large fish market, and the most important cattle market in the Netherlands after Rotterdam. The more important industries comprised cotton manufactures, iron works, boat-building, dyeing and bleaching, tanning, rope-making, and salt-making.

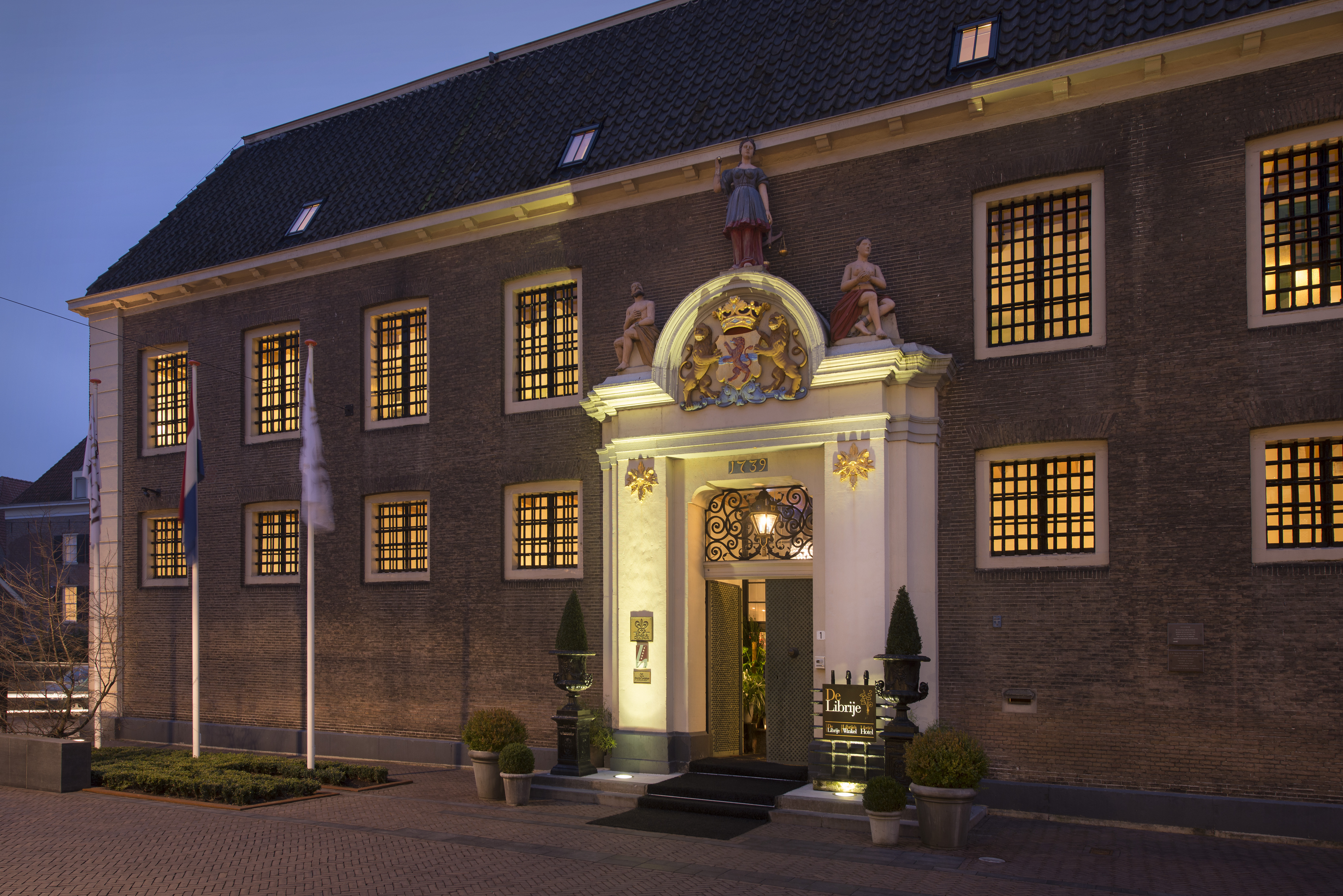
De Librije

In World War II, Zwolle was single-handedly liberated from the Nazis by Canadian soldier Léo Major. He was made an honorary citizen of Zwolle on 14 April 2005, the 60th anniversary of his liberating of the city. He also has a street named after him, Leo Majorlaan.

=== 21st century ===
In 2004, Zwolle's De Librije restaurant was honored with 3 stars by Michelin Guide; as of 2018, it is one of only three restaurants so honored in the entire country.

In 2023, Tewelde Goitom, an Eritrean convicted in Ethiopia of migrant smuggling, kidnapping in Sinai and human trafficking appeared at a pretrial hearing in Zwolle, which made international headlines.

=== Blauwvingers ===
Citizens of Zwolle are colloquially known as Blauwvingers (Bluefingers). According to legend, the name dates back to 1682, when the St Michael's church tower collapsed. The authorities were strapped for cash and saw no option but to sell the church bells to the neighbouring city Kampen. To make sure that Kampen would not make too much profit from the deal, the local authorities asked a high price for the church bells. Kampen accepted, but when the bells arrived it became clear that they were too damaged to be played. In revenge, Kampen paid in copper coins of four duiten (the equivalent of two-and-a-half cents). Zwolle distrusted Kampen and wanted to be sure they truly paid the entire price. After the meticulous counting of the vast number of copper coins, their fingers had turned blue.

In reality, the name Blauwvinger stems from 1521, when the governors of Zwolle broke the oath of loyalty they made to the Duke of Gelre. The name Blauwvinger refers to the raised fingers with which the governors had promised their loyalty to the Duke at his inauguration. At that time, Zwolle and Kampen were embroiled in a dispute over toll collection on the IJssel River. Zwolle initially aligned with the Duke of Gelre, Charles of Egmont, but eventually returned to the Bishop of Utrecht. During this period of political unrest, Duke Charles of Gelre was captured when he entered Zwolle. Ultimately, he was allowed to depart under the condition that Zwolle would retain its independence. The name Blauwvingers stems from the fact that the residents committed perjury twice, first to the bishop and then to the duke.

== Sites ==
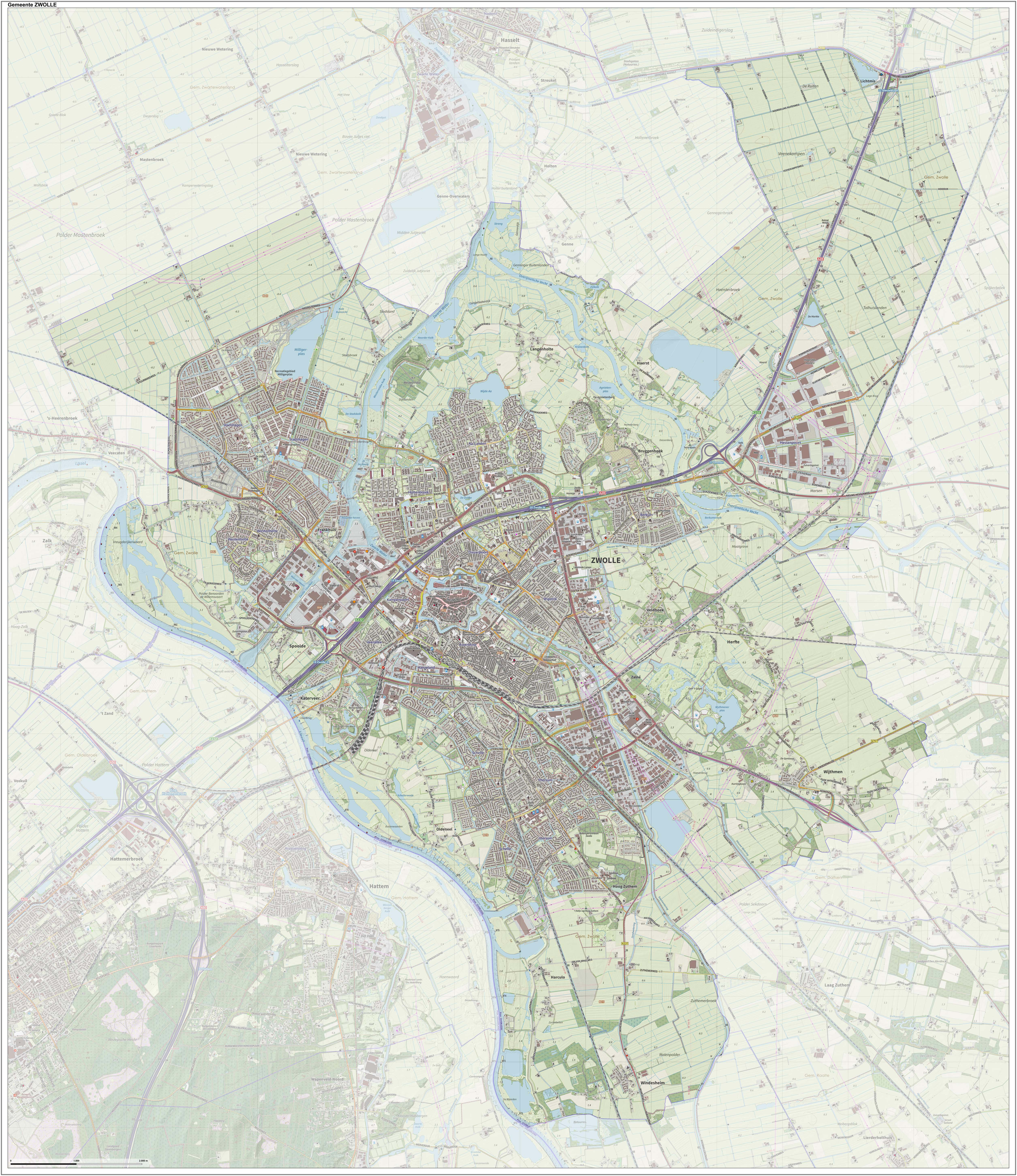
Topographic map of Zwolle in 2022

The Grote of Sint Michaëlskerk (St. Michael's church) has a baroque organ built by Arp Schnitger. The Roman Catholic Onze Lieve Vrouwe ten Hemelopneming-basilica (Our Lady of the Assumption) dates back to 1399. The church tower, called Peperbus (pepperpot), is one of the tallest and most famous church towers in the Netherlands. The modernized town hall was originally built in 1448.

The Broerenkerk church was part of a Dominican monastery founded in 1465. The monastery was closed in 1580 and the monks were expelled. From 1640 until 1982 the church was used for Protestant services. Following a restoration in 1983–1988 it was used for cultural events and became a bookstore.

=== Image gallery ===
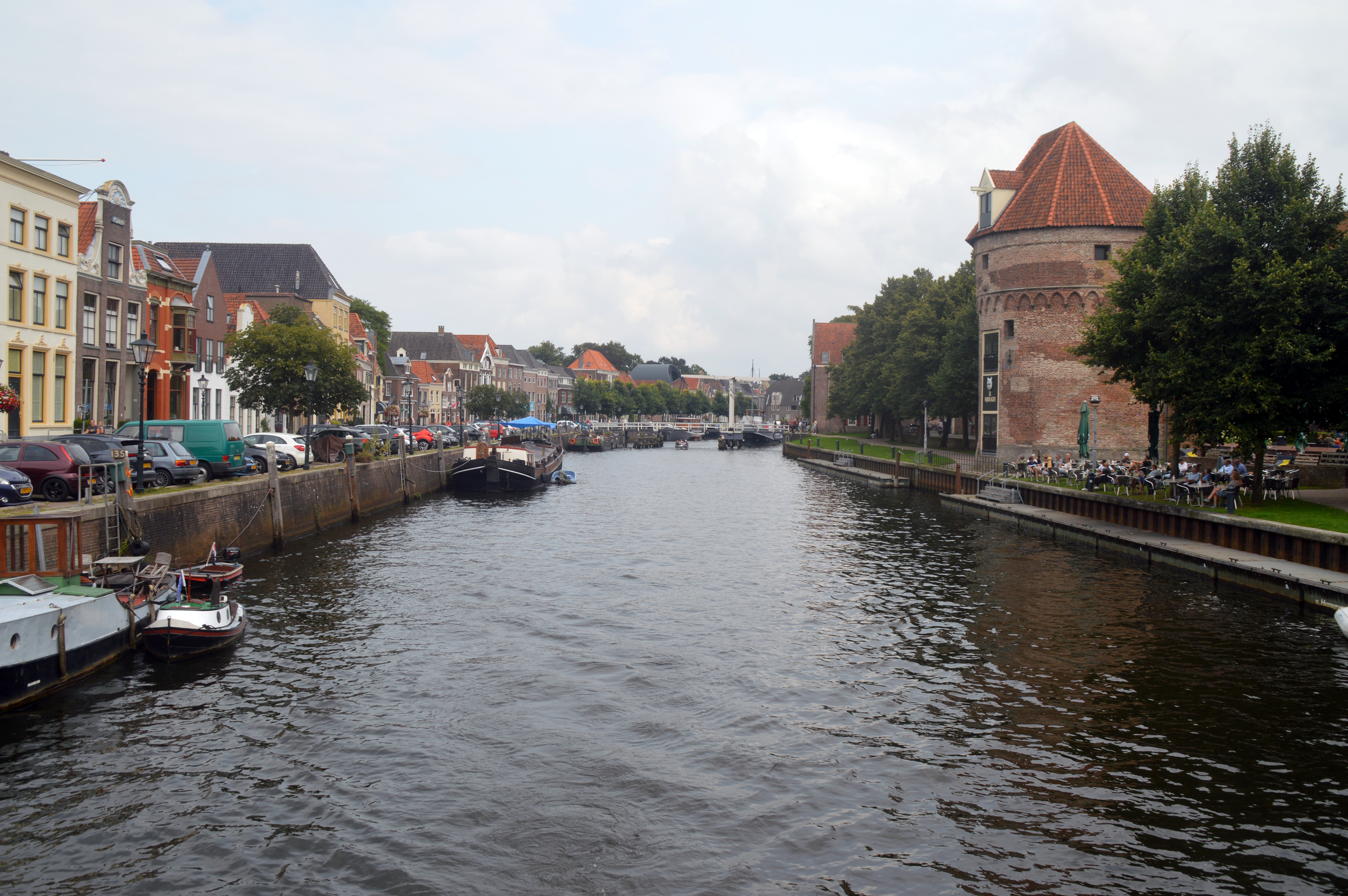
Thorbeckegracht and Wijndragerstoren

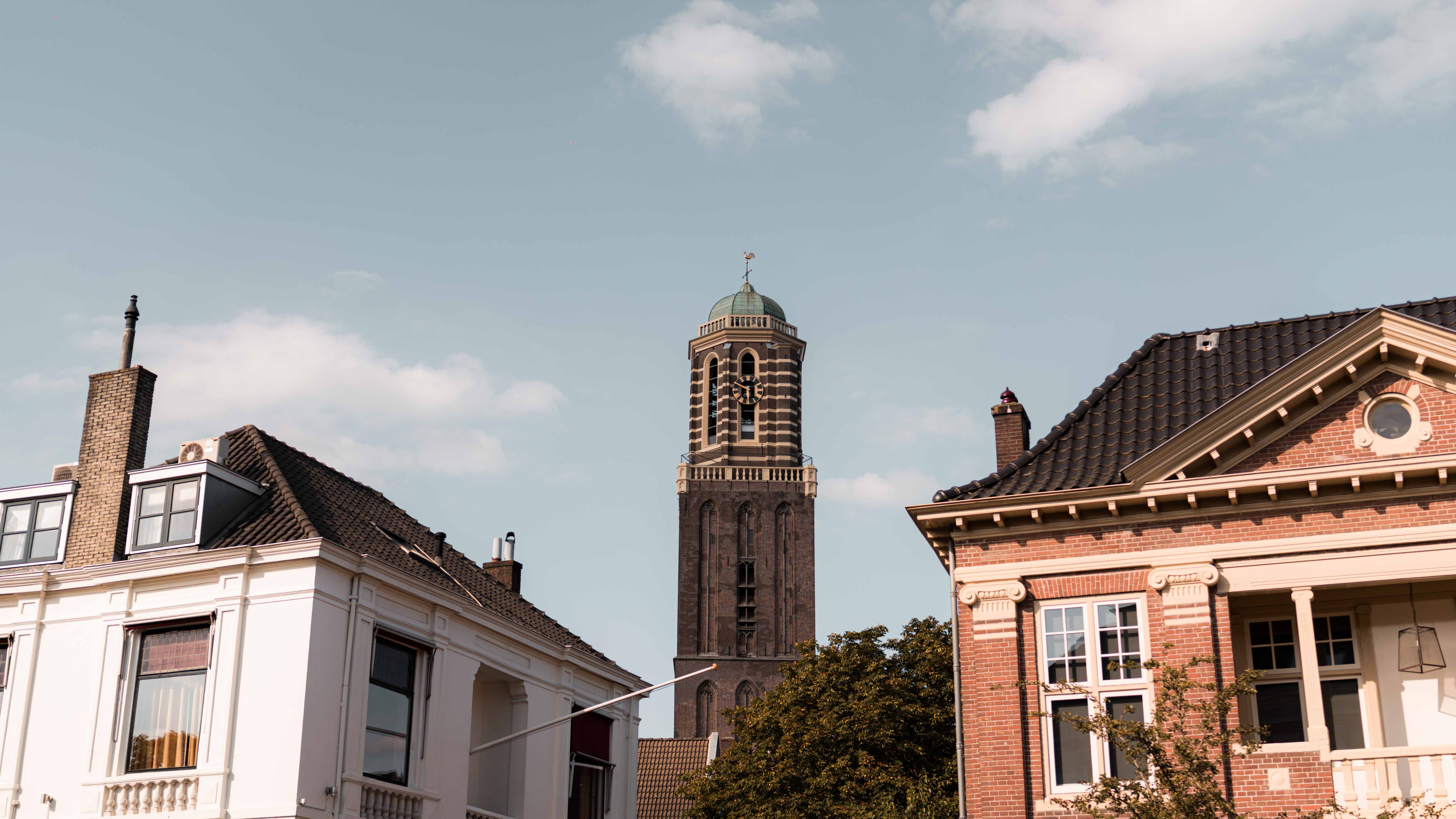
Peperbus from the Eekwal

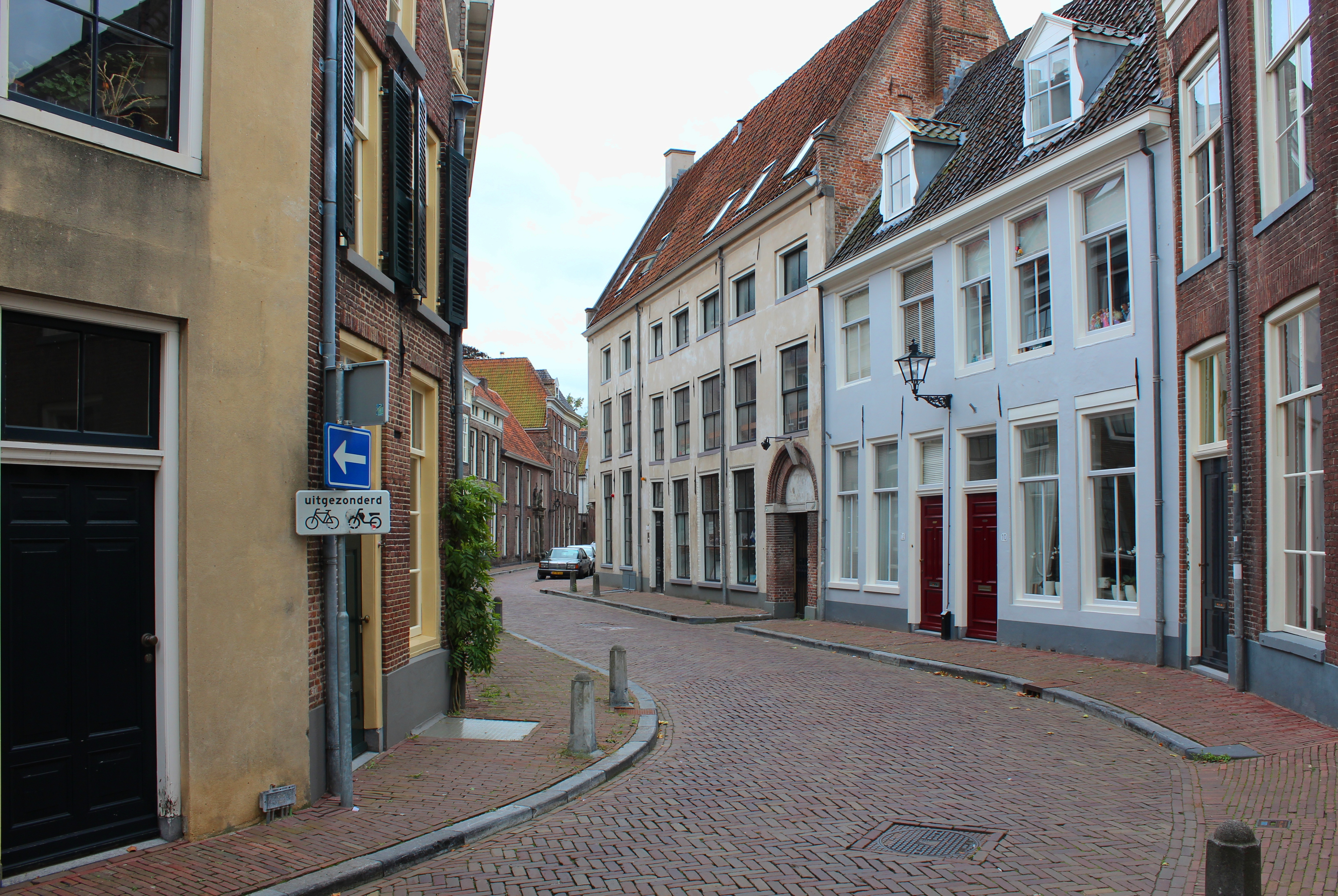
Praubstraat, inner city

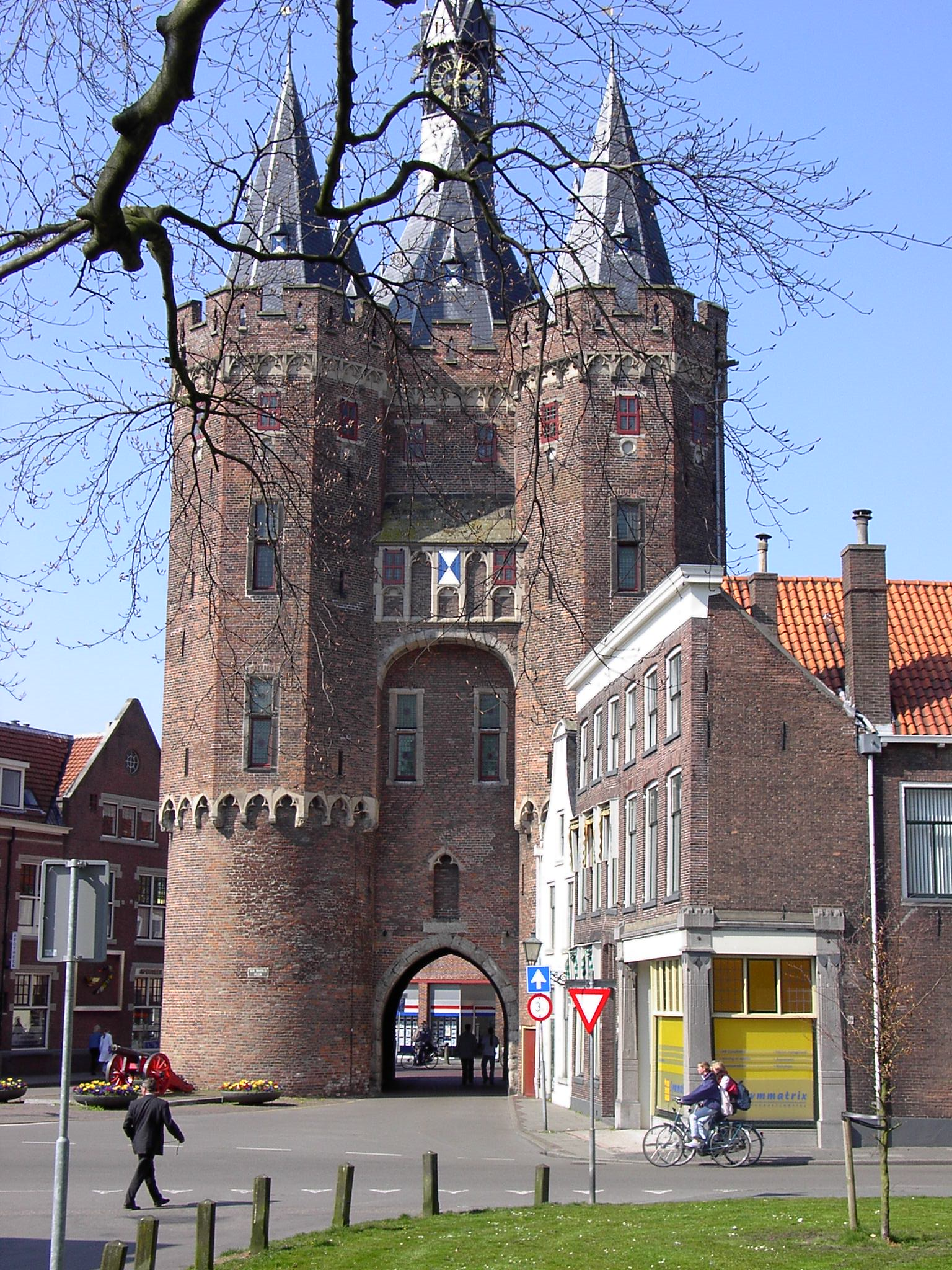
Sassenpoort

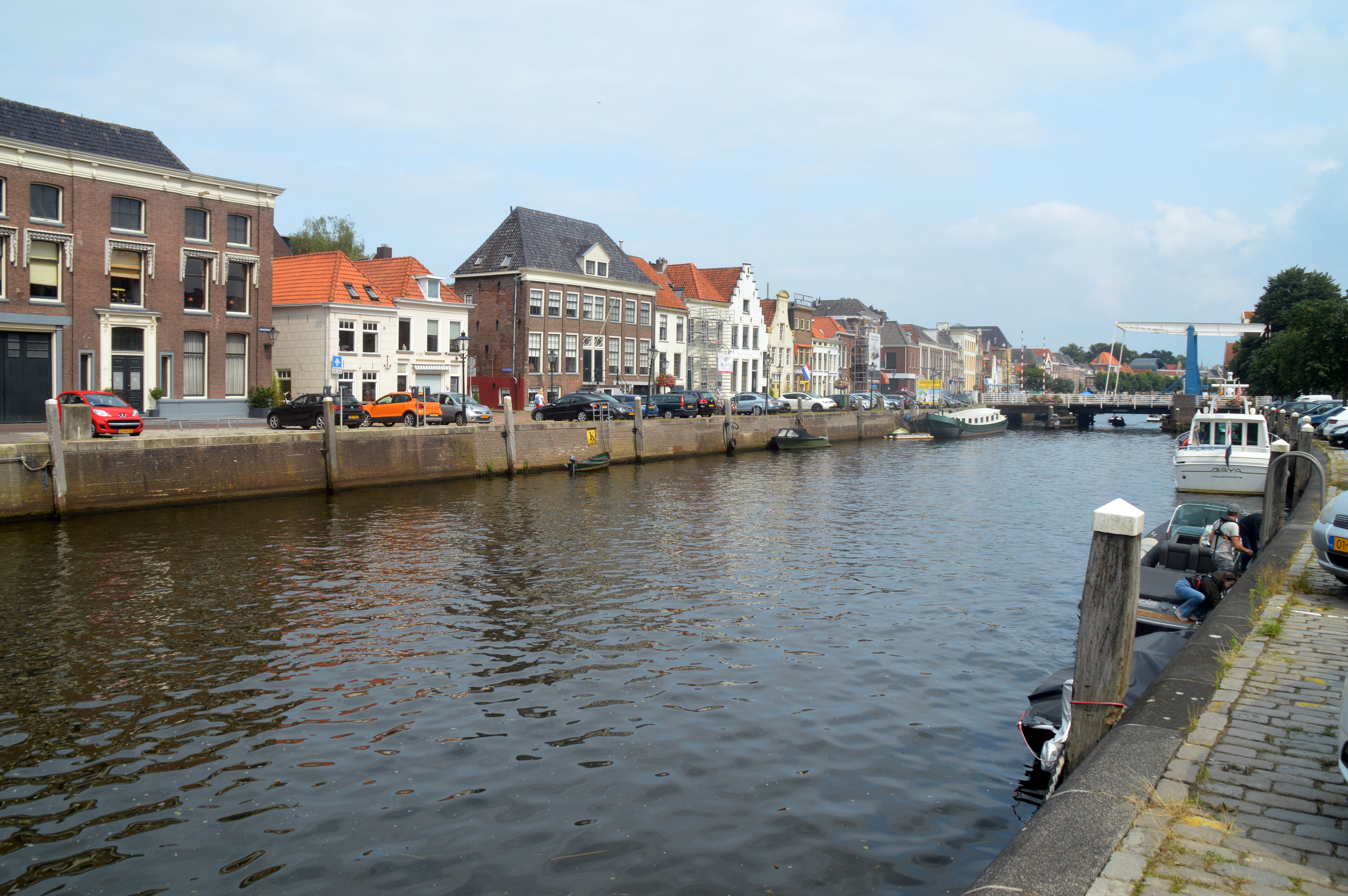
Thorbeckewal and Vispoortbridge

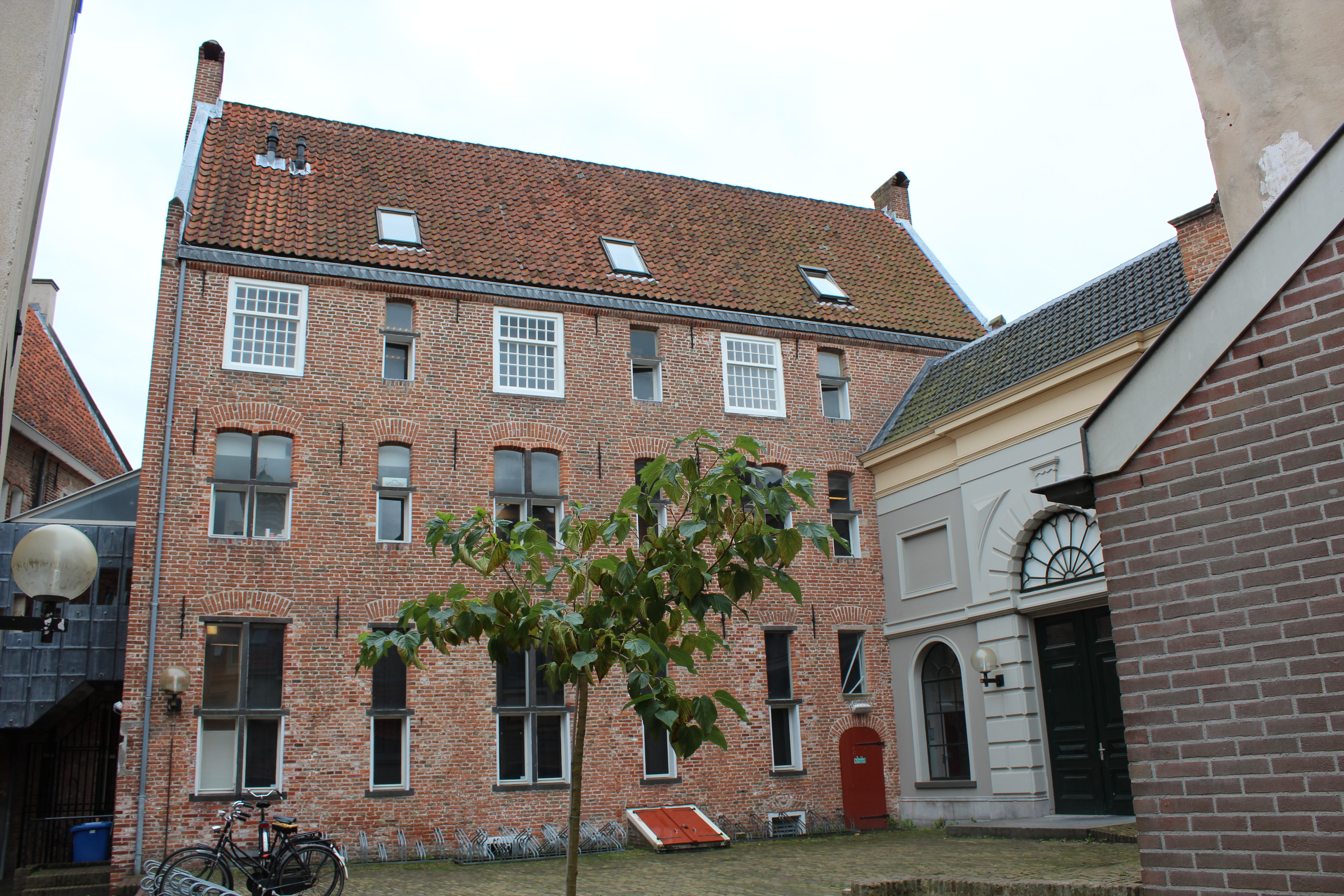
Rich Friar House, a center of Devotio Moderna and later home of teacher Willem Bartjens (nl)

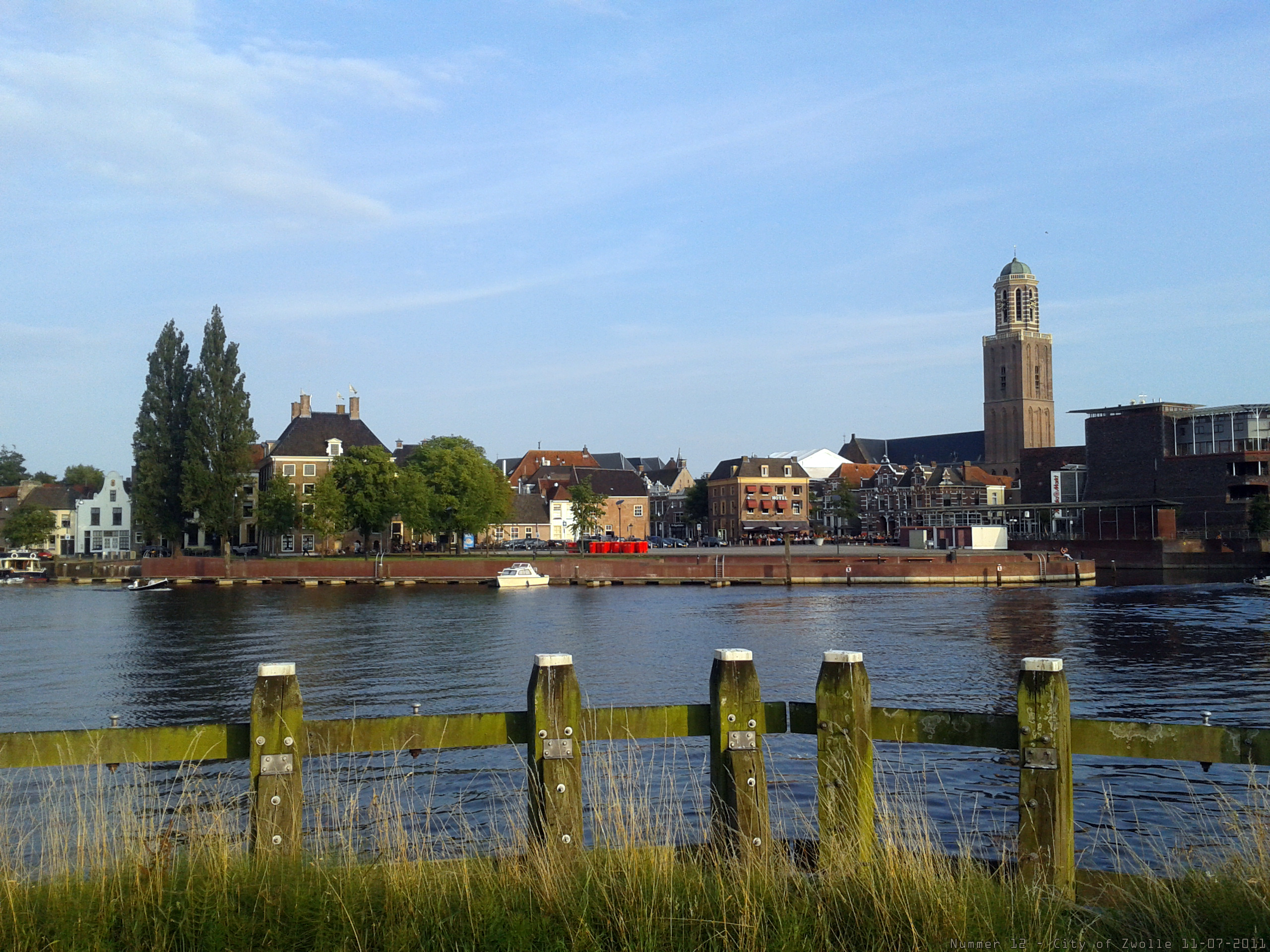
Zwolle city centre

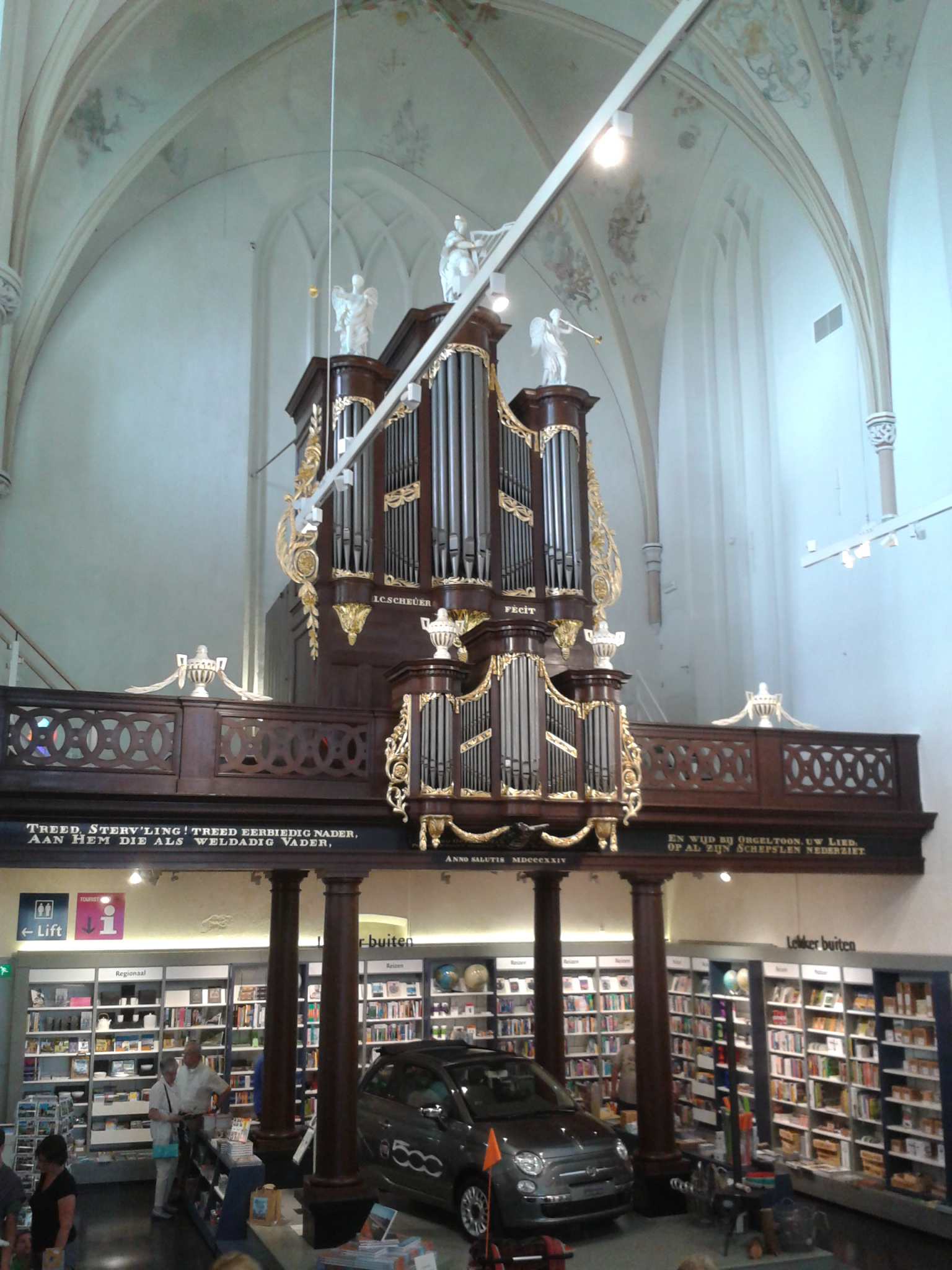
The organ in Broerenkerk

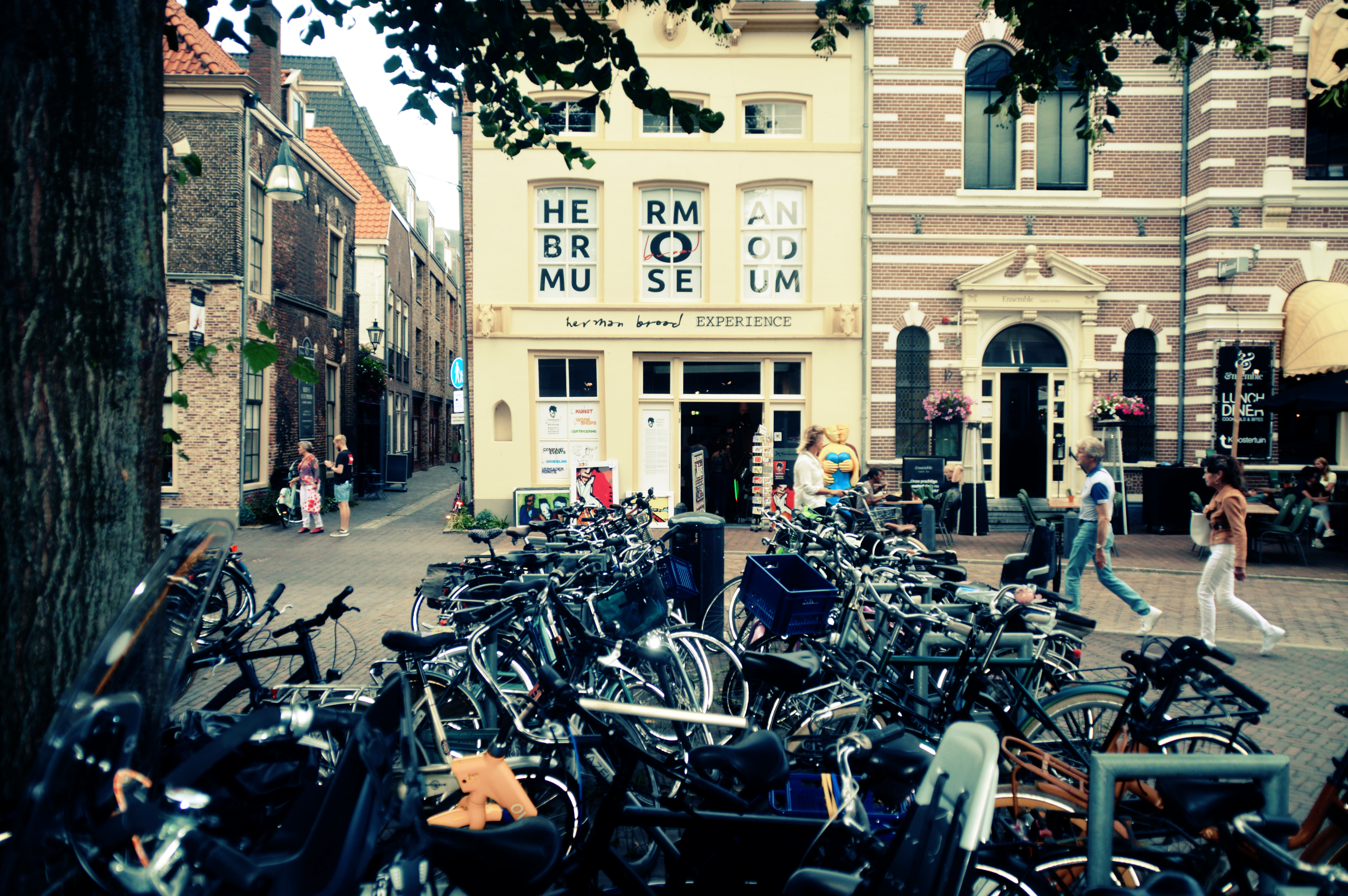
Herman Brood Museum & Experience

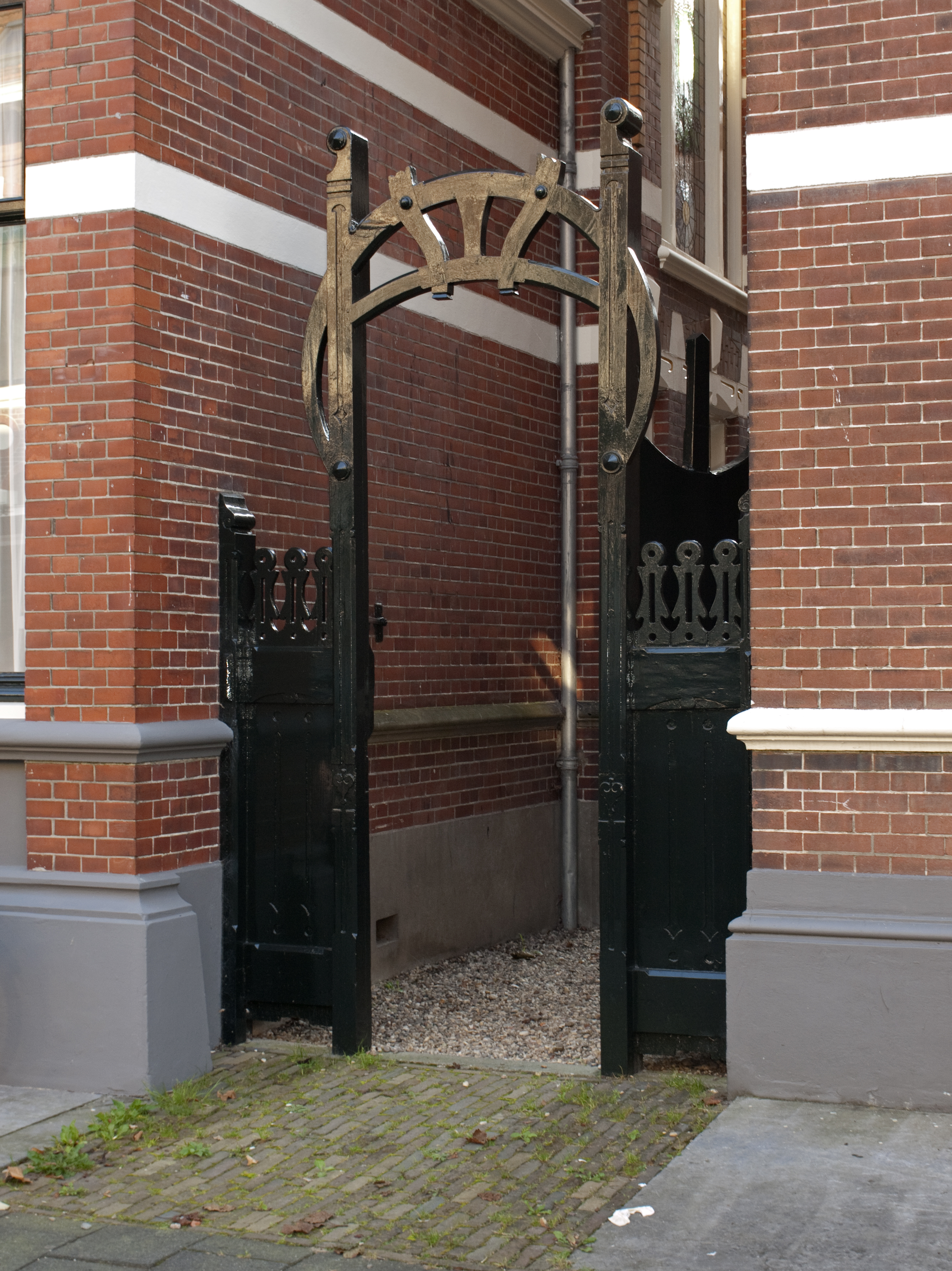
Art Nouveau gate from 1902 on Prins Hendrikstraat.

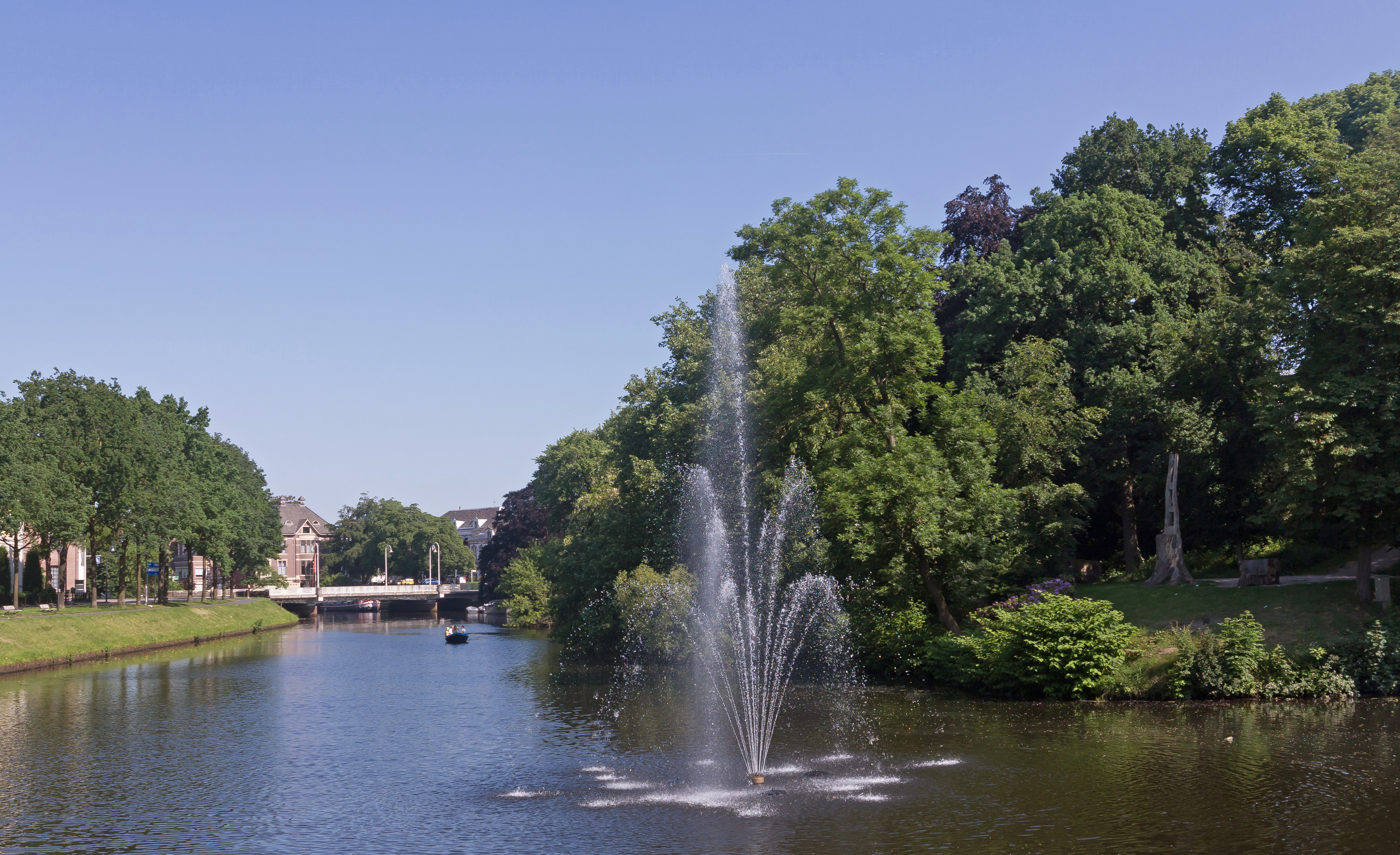
Fountain near Museum de Fundatie

== Notable residents ==
See also People from Zwolle
Arts, culture, entertainment and the media

- Willem Victor Bartholomeus (1825–1892), organist and conductor
- Hein Boele (1939-2025), actor, Dutch voice of Elmo
- Jonnie Boer (1965–2025), chef with three Michelin stars
- Gerard ter Borch (1617–1681), painter
- Gerard ter Borch the Elder (1583–1662), painter
- Moses ter Borch (1645–1667), painter
- Rolf Bremmer (born 1950), scholar of Old Frisian, and of Old and Medieval English
- Tooske Breugem (born 1974), television host actress
- Herman Brood (1946–2001), painter/rock star
- Funda Eryiğit (born 1984), Turkish actress
- Willem Grasdorp (1678–1723), painter
- Aleida Greve (1670–1742), painter
- Anna Cornelia Holt (1671–1692), painter
- Sophia Holt (1658–1734), painter
- Antonina Houbraken (1686–1736), draughtswoman
- Marnix Kappers (1943–2016), actor
- Thomas à Kempis (c. 1380–1471), canon and mystic
- Master I. A. M. of Zwolle (c. 1440–1490), engraver
- Ton Koopman (born 1944), a conductor, organist, and harpsichordist
- Yuri Landman (born 1973), experimental musical instrument builder, comic book artist
- Cornelia van Marle (1661–1698), painter
- Michael Minsky (1918–1988), singer and conductor
- Leonard van Munster (born 1972), artist
- Opgezwolle (since 2001), rap crew
- Jan Vayne (Jan Veenje) (born 1966), pianist
- Charlotte Wessels (born 1987), former singer for Delain
- Martijn Westerholt (born 1979), keyboard player for Delain
- Aleijda Wolfsen (1648–1692), painter

Authors

- Eef Brouwers (1939–2018), journalist and former head of the Netherlands Government Information Service
- A. den Doolaard (1901–1994), author
- Rhijnvis Feith (1753–1824), author
- Everhardus Johannes Potgieter (1808–1875), author

Business

- Willem Jan van Dedem (1776–1851), landowner and founder of the canal and town of Dedemsvaart, Overijssel
- Hendrikus Jacobus Gorter (1874-1918), ice skates manufacturer, cyclist and speed skater

Religion

- Johannes Busch (1399–c. 1480), church reformer and provost of the Augustinian monastic order
- Alanus de Rupe (1428–1475), Roman Catholic theologian and Dominican promotor of the rosary
- Andreas Ignatius Schaepman (1815–1882), Archbishop of Utrecht

Politics

- Laurens Jan Brinkhorst (born 1937), former Minister of Economic Affairs
- Joan Derk van der Capellen tot den Pol (1741–1784), role in the Batavian Republic
- Wybo Fijnje (1750–1809), Mennonite minister, publisher, exile, coup perpetrator, politician
- Willem Johan Lucas Grobbée (1822–1907), Minister of Finance from 1883 to 1885
- Johannes van Heerdt tot Eversberg (1829–1893), former governor of Suriname and Curaçao
- Piet Kasteel (1901–2003), ambassador and former governor of Curaçao
- Johan Rudolf Thorbecke (1798–1872), Prime Minister of the Netherlands (1849 - 1853, 1862 - 1866, 1871 - 1872)

Sports

- Anna van der Breggen (born 1990), Olympic and World Champion cyclist
- Jeroen Dubbeldam (born 1973), 2000 Olympic Equestrian champion
- Marten Eikelboom (born 1973), hockey player
- Maarten Grobbe (1901–1961), football player
- Martin Haar (born 1952), former football defender and current trainer
- Rinus Israël (1942–2025), former football player and scout
- Ron Jans (born 1958), former football player and current coach
- Bert Konterman (1971), football player
- Hennie van Nee (1939–1996), football player
- Eric Pierik (born 1959), field hockey player
- Tijjani Reijnders (born 1998), football player
- Johnny Rep (born 1951), football player
- Piet Schrijvers (1946–2022), football player
- Johannes Smeekens (born 1987), Olympic speedskater
- Jaap Stam (born 1972), former football player and current coach
- Bart Verbruggen (born 2002), football player
- Gerrit Voges (1932–2007), football player
- Peter Wessels (born 1978), tennis player

Science

- Christianus Carolus Henricus van der Aa (1718–1793), secretary of the Royal Holland Society of Sciences and Humanities
- Derk-Jan Dijk (Born 1958), researcher of sleep and circadian rhythms
- Thomas Joannes Stieltjes (1856–1894), mathematician, civil engineer and politician

== Educational institutions ==
Zwolle is home to several universities of applied sciences and colleges:

- Artez
- Christelijke Hogeschool Windesheim
- Deltion College Zwolle
- Hogeschool Zwolle
- Landstede Zwolle
- Cibap Zwolle
- Groene Welle Zwolle
- Hogeschool Viaa | nl
- Thorbecke Scholengemeenschap
- Windesheim Honours College

== Transport ==
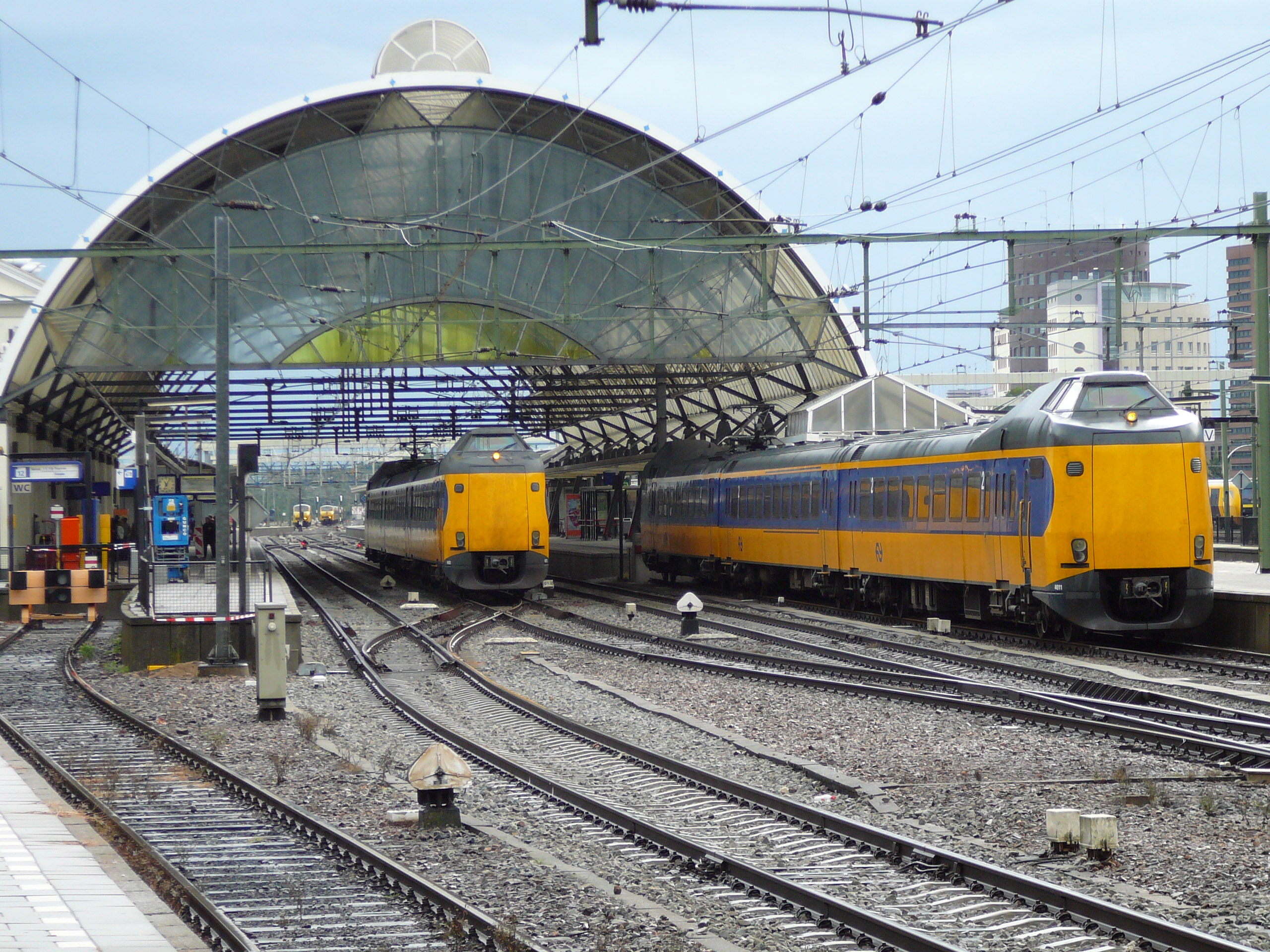
Zwolle railway station with ICMm train

=== Cycling ===
Nearly half of all trips in Zwolle were cycled as of 2013.

=== Road transport ===
The A28 serves Zwolle with 4 exits, and runs from Utrecht to Groningen. It was being widened to 8 lanes across the IJssel River and 6 lanes from Zwolle to Meppel in 2010 and 2011. The motorway initially opened between 1964 and 1970.

=== Rail transport ===
- Zwolle railway station

== International relations ==
=== Twin towns—sister cities ===
Zwolle is currently twinned with:

- Lünen, Germany

In the past, Zwolle had partnerships with:

- Érsekhalma, Hungary
- Rutobwe, Rwanda
- Vologda, Russia
- Kaliningrad, Russia

There is also a small rural town in the U.S. State of Louisiana named after Zwolle. The two cities maintain close informal ties.
