= Derk-Jan Dijk =

Dutch researcher of sleep and circadian rhythms

Derk-Jan Dijk FRSB FMedSci
- Born: Zwollerkerspel

Academic background
- Education: University of Groningen

Academic work
- Discipline: Sleep, sleep regulation, circadian rhythms
- Institutions: University of Surrey

Derk-Jan Dijk (born 1958 in Zwollerkerspel, Netherlands) is a researcher of sleep and circadian rhythms. As of 2024 he is a distinguished professor at the University of Surrey and the director of its Sleep Research Centre.

== Education and early career ==
Dijk attended the Meander College in Zwolle. He obtained a BSc and MSc (Cum Laude) in Biology at the University of Groningen. He received his PhD from the Faculty of Medicine at the University of Groningen in 1988, under supervision of the biologist Serge Daan, the physicist Domien Beersma and the psychiatrist Rutger van den Hoofdakker. The focus of his research was on testing the predictions of the two-process model of sleep regulation as developed by Alexander Borbely (1982), Serge Daan and Domien Beersma (1984). Dijk then conducted post-doctoral research at the Institute of Pharmacology at the University of Zurich with Alexander Borbely and was a Faculty Member at Harvard Medical School and an associated neuroscientist at the Brigham and Women's Hospital, Boston MA, working closely with Charles Czeisler. Dijk returned to Europe in 1999 to take up a faculty position at the University of Surrey.

== University of Surrey ==
Dijk created the Surrey Sleep Research Centre in 2003 and remains its director, leading a team that investigates the regulation and function of sleep and biological rhythms at many different levels of organisation, from gene expression to cognition. In 2005 he became a Professor of Sleep and Physiology. He served as Associate Dean (research) for the Faculty of Health and Medical Sciences (2013-2015). Dijk was also the Director of Sleep-Wake Research in the University of Surrey's Clinical Research Centre.

Derk-Jan Dijk was from 2009 to 2016 the Editor-in-Chief of the Journal of Sleep Research, the official journal of the European Sleep Research Society. He is a member of the editorial board of the Journal of Biological Rhythms. In 2021 he was a guest on the BBC Radio 4 programme The Life Scientific to talk about his life and work to a wider audience.

== Research ==
Dijk's research focusses on the regulation and function of sleep and its interaction with the circadian timing system in humans. He examines how sleep, sleep regulation and circadian rhythms change across the lifespan and how sleep and circadian rhythms are affected by environmental factors such as natural and artificial light. Dijk researches how individual differences in preferred timing of sleep is related to the biological clock and genetic variations. Dijk serves as a consultant to the pharmaceutical and lighting industry.

== Research findings and highlights ==
- 1987: Demonstrated that sleep timing can be shifted by bright light
- 1988: Identified gender differences in human sleep
- 1994/5: Characterized the circadian process regulating human sleep
- 1999: Discovered how circadian regulation of sleep changes with ageing
- 2004: Discovered melatonin's effects on human sleep timing
- 2007: Demonstrated the effects of changes in a 'clock' gene on human sleep and performance
- 2008: Conducted first large scale field trial to test the effect of blue light in the workplace
- 2009: Discovered of the daily and seasonal variation in the spectral composition of light exposure.
- 2010: Discovered that older people are less sleepy than young people
- 2012: Discovered association between circadian clock and sleep timing during the week and the weekend
- 2014: Demonstrated that mistimed sleep disrupts the circadian organization of the human blood transcriptome

== Honours and awards ==
Dijk is a Fellow of the Society of Biology and the Academy of Medical Sciences. Dijk's pioneering sleep-wake research was recognised with a Royal Society Wolfson Research Merit Award in April 2013.

Dijk's contribution to sleep research was recognized by the Distinguished Scientist Award from the Sleep Research Society in 2015. This award is the highest award presented by the Sleep Research Society and honors a single individual for research contributions made over an entire career.
