= Windesheim University of Applied Sciences =

University in The Netherlands

Coordinates: 52°30′00″N 6°04′48″E

- Hogeschool Windesheim
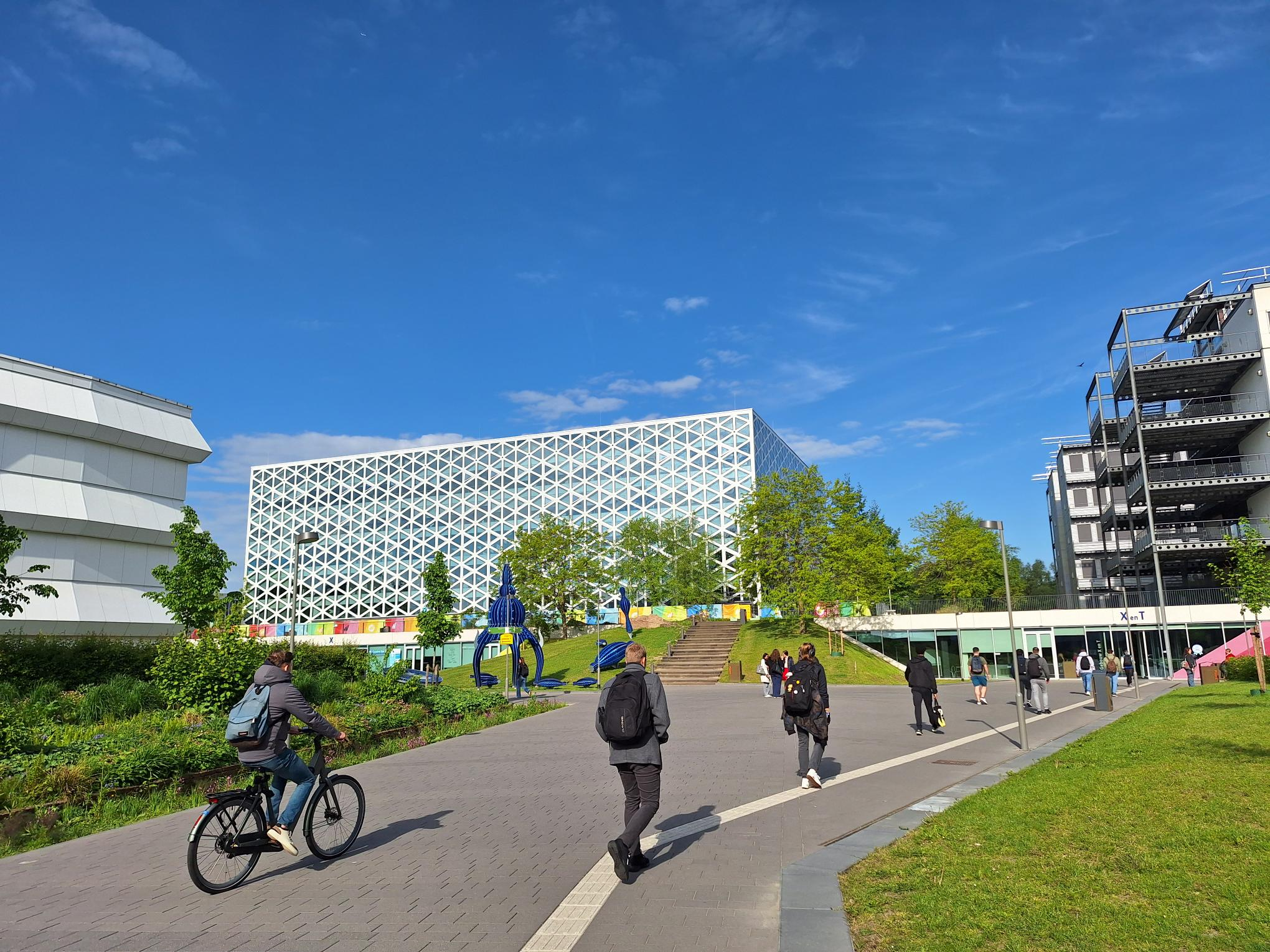
- Type: Public vocational university
- Established: 1986
- Affiliations: Association of Universities of Applied Sciences
- President: Erika Diender
- Faculty: 3,004
- Students: 26,589
- Location: Zwolle and Almere, The Netherlands
- Website: www.windesheim.com

The Windesheim University of Applied Sciences is a public vocational university in Zwolle and Almere The Netherlands. It was founded in 1986 and its buildings are an example of modern architecture, among others the X-building.

== History ==
Windesheim University, as it exists today, was established in 1986 through the merger of several educational providers. This merger occurred gradually over several years. It brought together the Academy for Journalism, the Academy for Social Studies from Kampen, and the School of Physical Exercise from Arnhem, to form the new institution. Most of the participating educational providers were based in Zwolle and included Higher Education in Economics and Administration (HEAO), Higher Education in Engineering and Technology (HTS), College of Education, School of Nursing, Academy of Journalism, and Higher Education in Information Technology.

== Campuses ==
Windesheim has two campuses: one in Zwolle, also including the English taught bachelor and exchange programmes for international students, and one in Almere for Dutch students.

== Study Programmes ==
Windesheim offers approx. 75 bachelor's degree programmes, approx. 15 associate degree programmes, a few masters and approx 250 part-time study programmes and courses. Two of the bachelor's degree programmes are taught in English: International Business and Global Project and Change Management. Approx. 20 exchange programmes are taught in English, namely in the areas of business, IT, engineering, health, sports, education and media.
