= Johanna Meijer =

Dutch chronobiologist

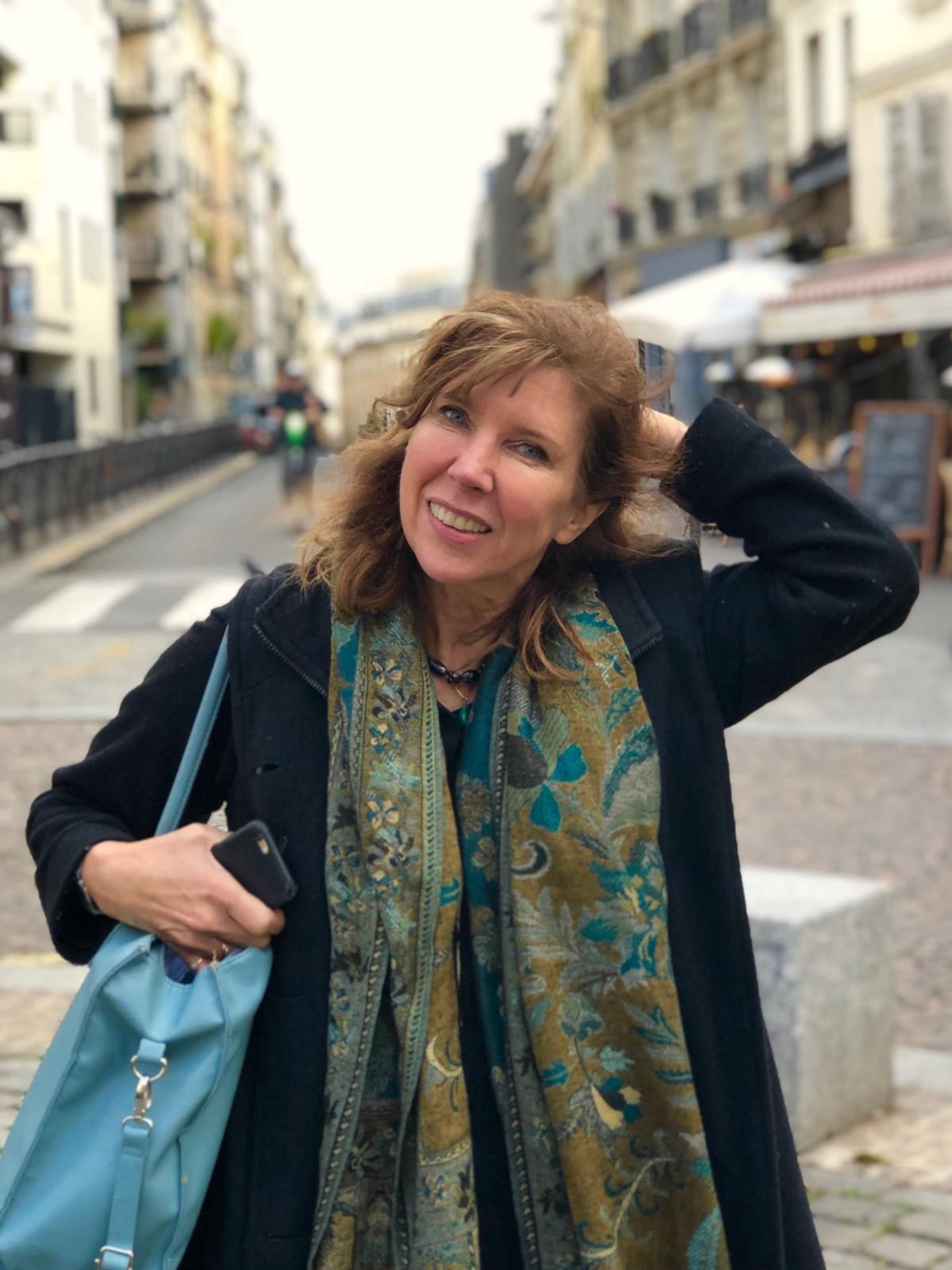
Johanna H. Meijer
- Born: 26 March 1959; The Hague, Netherlands
- Education: Leiden University
- Known for: Circadian Rhythms
- Scientific career
- Fields: Chronobiology, Neurophysiology
- Website: https://www.johannahmeijer.com/

Johanna H. Meijer (born 26 March 1959) is a Dutch scientist who has contributed to the fields of chronobiology and neuroscience. She initiated a nationwide program, involving eight Dutch universities to study the effects of clock disturbance on human health and biodiversity. Meijer is the 2016 recipient of the Aschoff and Honma Prize.

== Biography ==
=== Academic career ===
Meijer attended Leiden University in the Netherlands, where she obtained her master's degree (cum laude) in the Department of Biology, Physics, and Medicine. Meijer began her work on circadian rhythms alongside electrophysiologist Gerard Groos, who died in 1985. Meijer continued building on Groos' foundational work, allowing for translational research, and expanded electrophysiological techniques to in-vivo recordings. In 1989, she completed her PhD. in Medical Sciences (cum laude). After receiving a fellowship from the Dutch Royal Academy of Sciences in 2007, she was appointed full Professor and Chair of the Neurophysiology Group at Leiden University Medical Centre, where she continues to advance her research on circadian rhythms and chronobiology. Additionally, she served as a five-year visiting professor in the Department of Ophthalmology at the University of Oxford in the United Kingdom.

== Major discoveries ==
- Identification of the mechanism for photoperiodic encoding by the central clock
- Identification of glutamate neurotransmitter for entrainment to the external light-dark cycle and GABA neurotransmitter for entrainment within the central clock
- Discovery of short wavelength photoreceptor role for photoentrainment
- Identification of blue, green, and red light response in the central clock of humans by fMRI
- Identification of clock response to physical activity and sleep

== Research and achievements ==
Light serves as the primary environmental cue for the mammalian circadian clock, a topic that has been central to Meijer's work from the outset of her career. Her early studies established that glutamate is the main neurotransmitter conveying photic signals from the eye to the suprachiasmatic nucleus (SCN), with NMDA receptors mediating entrainment to light, while GABA coordinates information processing within the SCN itself.

She further demonstrated that photoperiodic encoding — the ability of the circadian system to register seasonal changes in day length — arises from a reorganization of the temporal activity patterns of SCN neurons as a tissue-level property. Comparable to pattern recognition in the visual cortex, these findings introduced hierarchical levels of regulation within the circadian system and motivated her to incorporate complexity theory into her work.

Building on these foundations, Meijer expanded the field by demonstrating that, alongside light, behavioral activity exerts a directinfluence on the electrical activity of SCN neurons. Through her self-developed in vivo methodology, she was the first to capture a real-time two-way interaction between sleep, physical activity, and the central clock under naturalistic conditions. This bidirectional coupling revealed that the SCN not only drives behavioral rhythms but is simultaneously modulated by them, emphasizing the dynamic interplay between brain, behavior, and environment.

Her investigations extended to the photoreceptive mechanisms underlying entrainment. Meijer demonstrated that SCN neurons function as light intensity detectors, optimally suited to distinguish between light and day. She also identified a distinct role for ultraviolet-sensitive receptors in nocturnal species. Using ultra-high field 7T fMRI in humans, she characterized differential SCN responses to blue, green, and red light wavelengths, further elucidating the system's spectral sensitivity.

The dominant role of light exposure led her to explore the effects of light pollution, conducting both laboratory and field studies to quantify its ecological and physiological consequences. This work contributed to a unique national initiative that brought together eight universities, numerous municipalities, and various organizations to mitigate nocturnal light emission and protect public health as well as biodiversity.

In parallel, her translational research addresses how circadian disruption affects human health, including aging, depression, ADHD, and cancer-related fatigue, while exploring pharmacological strategies to strengthen circadian resilience. Through the lens of complexity science, Meijer continues to unravel the nonlinear, dynamic feedback loops that govern the continuous integration of environmental and endogenous signals within the circadian system.

== Awards and recognitions ==
- 2026: Knight of the Order of the Netherlands Lion.
- 2021: Member of Academia Europaea
- 2020: Dutch National Research Agenda Grant of 10.2 million euros– "BioClock Consortium". www.bioclockconsortium.org
- 2020: "Ambassador of the Night" Initiative of the Dutch Nature and Environment Federation.
- 2019: European Advanced Research Grant of 2.2 million euros, ERC: "The circadian clock in day-active species: preserving our health in modern society"
- 2016: Aschoff and Honma Prize in Biological Rhythm Research (International Selection Committee, chaired by Dr. Takao Kondo)
- 2015: C.U Ariens Kappers Award from the Netherlands Society for the advancement of Sciences, Medicine, and surgery- 2015
- 2015: Board member, National Research Agenda (NWO) Complexity cluster; successfully raised 19.5 million euros on Dutch Complexity Research
- 2014–Present: Member of the Royal Dutch Society of Sciences.
- 2013 – 2019: Visiting Professor- Nuffield Laboratory of Ophthalmology, Sleep and Circadian Neuroscience Institute, Dept. of Ophthalmology, University of Oxford, Oxford, UK
- 1999: 'Best teacher' award for the period 1994-1999 of the study "BioPharmaceutical Sciences" at Leiden University.
- 1993: "Aschoff's Rule, a prize for eminent contributions in Chronobiology supporting the interdisciplinary spirit of the field" from Prof. J. Hall (Nobel prize winner).
- 1989: Fellowship of the Royal Dutch Academy of Sciences.
