= Alexander Borbély =

Hungarian-Swiss pharmacologist

Alexander A. Borbély (born 25 March 1939) is a Hungarian-born Swiss pharmacologist and sleep researcher. He is professor emeritus of pharmacology at the University of Zurich and is best known for developing the two-process model of sleep regulation, a framework that has had a major influence on modern sleep science and chronobiology.

== Early life and education ==
Borbély was born in Budapest, Hungary. He moved to Switzerland as a child after German troops entered Hungary in 1944, and began studying medicine in 1957. He studied medicine in Geneva, Zurich, Vienna, Paris, Sheffield and Warsaw and graduated from the Medical Faculty of the University of Zurich in 1963.

Interested in applying signal analysis to biomedical research, Borbély spent two years as a postdoctoral researcher at the Research Laboratory of Electronics of the Massachusetts Institute of Technology in Cambridge, Massachusetts, where he began research on sleep.

== Academic career ==
After returning to Zurich, Borbély established a research group at the Institute of Pharmacology of the University of Zurich. He qualified as a Privatdozent at the university’s Medical Faculty in 1971, was appointed associate professor in 1983 and became full professor in 1992. The university’s description of its sleep-research CD-ROM states that he built up an animal sleep laboratory in the early 1970s, that Irene Tobler joined the group in 1975, that human sleep research began in 1980 in collaboration with Dietrich Lehmann and Inge Strauch, and that Peter Achermann joined in 1983.

Borbély served as Dean of the Medical Faculty of the University of Zurich from 1998 to 2000 and as Vice-President for Research (Prorektor Forschung) of the University from 2000 to 2006. After his retirement in 2006 he presided over the steering committee of the Swiss National Research Programme “Non-Ionising Radiation – Health and Environment” (NRP 57) until 2010. Between 2012 and 2014 he was a delegate of the University of Zurich in the project “Universitäre Medizin Zürich” of the Government Council of the Canton of Zurich.

In professional societies, Borbély was vice-president of the European Sleep Research Society (ESRS) in 1982–1984 and its president from 1988 to 1992. In 1985 he spent a sabbatical at the Neuroscience Institute in New York, where he and Serge Daan organised a meeting at Rockefeller University to discuss the two-process model and a competing two-oscillator model.

== Research ==
Borbély's research has focused on the regulation of sleep and wakefulness. His work combined animal experimentation, human sleep studies, quantitative electroencephalography, signal analysis, and mathematical modelling.

He is best known for proposing the two-process model of sleep regulation in 1982. The model describes sleep timing and sleep intensity as the interaction of two processes: a homeostatic sleep drive (Process S), which increases during wakefulness and dissipates during sleep, and a circadian process (Process C), which is governed by the biological clock.

Borbély and collaborators subsequently expanded the model through studies of electroencephalographic slow-wave activity, sleep homeostasis, circadian rhythms, sleep deprivation, hypnotic drugs, and mathematical simulations of sleep-wake regulation. His work contributed to the understanding of slow-wave sleep as a marker of sleep pressure and to the quantitative analysis of sleep electroencephalograms in humans and animals.

Borbély authored more than 300 peer-reviewed scientific publications and several books on sleep and sleep regulation. He served as president of the European Sleep Research Society (1988-1992) and was founding president of the Swiss Society for Sleep Research, Sleep Medicine and Chronobiology (1991).

== Honours and awards ==
- Anna-Monika Prize (1985)
- Pisa Sleep Award (1998)
- Distinguished Scientist Award, World Federation of Sleep Research and Sleep Medicine Societies (1999)
- Distinguished Scientist Award, Sleep Research Society (2003)
- Peter C. Farrell Prize for Sleep Medicine, Harvard Medical School (2008)
- Sleep Science Award, European Sleep Research Society (2014)
- Bernese Sleep Award (2023)

He also received honorary doctorates from University of Szeged (1998) and Medical University of Warsaw (1999).

== Selected works ==
- Borbély AA (1982). "A two process model of sleep." Human Neurobiology 1(3):195–204.
- Daan S, Beersma DGM, Borbély AA (1984). "Timing of human sleep: recovery process gated by a circadian pacemaker." American Journal of Physiology 246:R161–R183.
- Borbély AA, Tobler I (1989). "Endogenous sleep promoting substances and sleep regulation." Physiological Reviews 69(2):605–670.
- Borbély AA, Achermann P (1999). "Sleep homeostasis and models of sleep regulation." Journal of Biological Rhythms 14(6):557–568.
- Borbély AA, Daan S, Wirz-Justice A, Deboer T (2016). "The two-process model of sleep regulation: a reappraisal." Journal of Sleep Research 25(2):131–143.
- Borbély A (2022). "The two-process model of sleep regulation: Beginnings and outlook." Journal of Sleep Research 31.
- Borbély A, Tobler I (2024). "The two process model: Origin of its concepts and their implications." Clinical and Translational Neuroscience 8.

=== Books ===
- Pharmacological Modification of Evoked Brain Potentials (1973)
- Das Geheimnis des Schlafs (1984; English translation: Secrets of Sleep, 1986; translation into 8 other languages)
- Schlaf (2004)
- Mehr als Schlaf: Erinnerungen und Erkundungen eines Schlafforschers (2019)
