= Sato Honma =

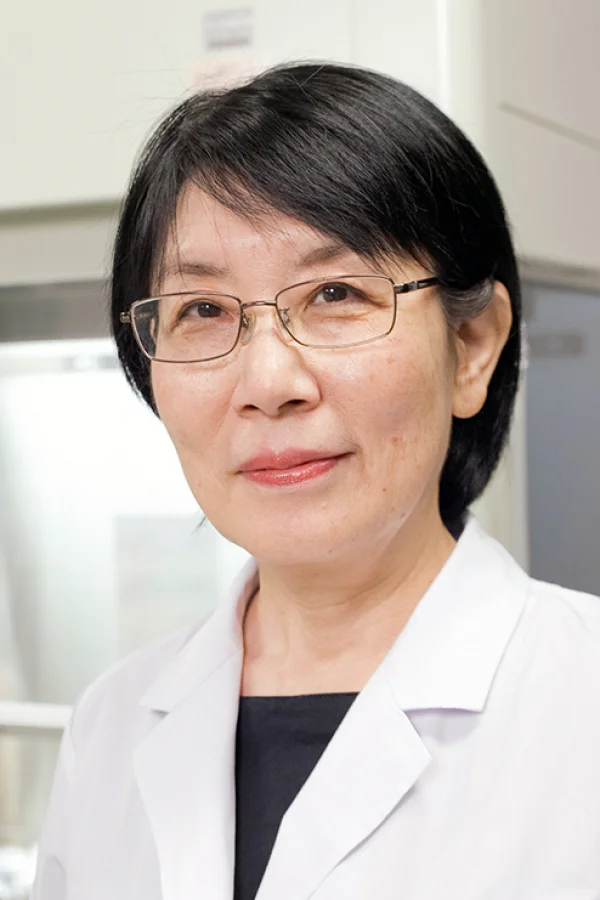
Sato Honma

Sato Honma is a Japanese chronobiologist who researches the biological mechanisms of circadian rhythms. She mainly collaborates with Ken-Ichi Honma on publications, and both of their primary research focuses are the human circadian clock under temporal isolation and the mammalian suprachiasmatic nucleus (SCN), its components, and associates. Honma is a retired professor at the Hokkaido University School of Medicine in Sapporo, Japan. She received her Ph.D. in physiology from Hokkaido University. She taught physiology at the School of Medicine and then at the Research and Education Center for Brain Science at Hokkaido University. She is currently the director at the Center for Sleep and Circadian Rhythm Disorders at Sapporo Hanazono Hospital and works as a somnologist.

== Life and career ==
Sato Honma and Ken-ichi Honma are married and currently live in Japan. She was born in Kitahiroshima City, Hokkaido, Japan on July 9, 1947.

In 1976, Honma received her Ph.D. from Hokkaido University. After finishing a year of Resident at the Pediatric Department of Hokkaido University Hospital, she continued research at Max-Planck Institute for Biophysical Chemistry in Goettingen, Germany as well as at the anatomy department at Hokkaido University School of Medicine. In 1981, Honma became an assistant professor at Hokkaido University School of Medicine. Since then, she has continued working at the Department of Physiology, at Hokkaido University, where she was a Lecturer, Associate Professor, Professor, and after retirement, as a Specially Appointed Professor. Her work at Hokkaido University extends through the School of Medicine, the Graduate School of Medicine, as well as the Hokkaido University, Research and Education Center for Brain Science. The courses she taught include endocrinology, ecophysiology, gastrointestinal physiology, pulmonary function, circulation, hematology, and renal physiology of hematology.

Honma worked as a physician at the Sapporo Hanazono Hospital while working as a visiting professor at the Brain Science Research and Education Centre at Hokkaido University. She is affiliated with the Japanese Society of Sleep Research, Physiological Society of Japan, Japan Neuroscience Society and the Japanese Society for Chronobiology. She was a member of the Science Council of Japan (2011~2017) and now an associate member (2017~). She specializes in biological rhythm regulation mechanisms as well as circadian rhythm sleep disorders.

Sato Honma and Ken-ichi Honma had a chronobiology laboratory for over 30 years at Hokkaido University, and many of the students in their lab are now conducting their own research in many parts in and outside Japan. They organized domestic and international meetings, including the biannual Sapporo Symposium on Biological Rhythms. The laboratory, meetings, and academic activities of Sato Honma and Ken-Ichi Honma were instrumental in forming the network of chronobiologists in Japan and Asia.

== Achievements and awards ==
In 2000, Honma was awarded the Aschoff's Rule Award for her work on rodents. In the same year, she was awarded the Hokkaido University School of Medicine Excellent Research Award.

In 2014, she organized International Chronobiology Summer School in Sapporo, Japan. She was one of the instructors for the International Chronobiology Summer School, in Beijing in 2016, and that in Munich 2019.

In 2020, both Sato Honma and Ken-Ichi Honma were awarded the SRBR Director's Award for mentoring. The SRBR Award honors and thanks members of the Society for Research on Biological Rhythms for their large-scale contributions to the field of Chronobiology.

== Patents ==
In 2006, she applied for and holds a patent on transgenic mice whose expression levels of two clock genes are measured by the activity of two luciferases (Japanese Patent Application Laid-open No.2006.304642).

== Scientific contributions ==
Together, Sato Honma and Ken-ichi Honma have authored over 200 scholarly articles and published several edited volumes which serve to summarize and expand on award-winning papers and lectures by leading scientists in the field of Chronobiology.

=== Past contributions ===
Photoperiodic entrainment is their life-long research focus. They discovered the seasonality in human circadian rhythms in a temporal isolation facility. They confirmed the seasonality in clock gene expression rhythms in the mouse SCN and identified the SCN regions responsible for the so-called E and M oscillators, which drive the onset and end of the activity.

Earlier in their careers, in collaboration with Dr. Masaaki Ikeda who discovered Bmal1, Sato Honma and Ken-Ichi Honma were also able to detect circadian rhythms in the Bmal1 gene expression via in situ hybridization in rats’ SCN. They found that Bmal1 expression was highest during the rats’ subjective night and rhythms of mRNA expression were found in other regions of the brain like the hippocampus and the cerebellum. These findings allowed them to deduce that BMAL1 also plays a significant role in regulating circadian rhythms in rats.

Sato Honma and Ken-ichi Honma and their team also found that Dec1 and Dec2 expression regulate the circadian rhythm in the SCN and their gene products suppressed the transactivation of Per(s) by BMAL1/CLOCK heterodimer (similar to CRY(s)/ PER8s. These studies were carried out in collaboration with the Dr. Yukio Kato group. Specifically, they found that Dec1 expression responds differently to light pulses than Dec2, but both of their expression peaks during the subjective day. Dec1 peaks slightly earlier than Dec2. They also discovered that Dec1 expression responds to light in a phase-dependent manner. Authors reported that Dec1 and Dec2 expressed circadian rhythms in constant darkness (DD) and in light-dark conditions and maintained these rhythms with changing light conditions. These findings about the Dec genes are significant in that they form a fifth family of clock-genes that play a part in generating circadian rhythms.

Of her numerous contributions concerning the central clock in humans and mammals, one of Honma's life-long series of experiments involves methamphetamine (MAP)-induced behavioral rhythms in rodents, which does not depend on the SCN and desynchronizes from the circadian pacemaker in the SCN. They regard the MAP induced behavior rhythm as the model of human sleep-wake cycle which also desynchronizes from the circadian pacemaker. Recently, they found the candidate sites of MAP-induced oscillators called MAO in the dopaminergic system in the brain.

Sato Honma and Ken-ichi Honma have long been involved in the studies of the ontogeny of circadian clocks in nocturnal rodents and clarified the role of nursing mothers on pup circadian clocks. Taking advantage of clock gene Cry double mutant mice, they demonstrated the circadian system of the neonatal SCN was substantially different from that of adult mice. They found multiple clusters of cellular circadian oscillations in the SCN, which have different periods but are able to mutually couple. Neuropeptides in the SCN, AVP and VIP play critical roles in the coupling of cellular oscillation and in the expression of coherent circadian rhythms in adult and neonatal mice.

=== Current contributions ===
Honma's current work focuses on expanding on her previous findings involving the development of circadian rhythms in the mammalian SCN by using novel molecular markers and circadian rhythm-monitoring techniques.

Building off of earlier findings that chronic methamphetamine (MAP) induces rhythms that are SCN-independent, Sato Honma and Ken-ichi Honma wanted to study how methamphetamine-induced oscillators (MAO), and food-entrained oscillators (FEO), which are both independent of the SCN, affect the expression of the Per2 gene in rats. Their results, visualized with the Period2-dLuciferase reporter bioluminescence system, showed that after administering MAP, MAO behavior not only was induced but also entrained to light-dark (LD) cycles, with the help of the SCN pacemaker. They found that MAO also occurred in Per2 expression circadian rhythms and phase-shifted these rhythms in regions that do not include the SCN. From these results, they were able to conclude that Per2 rhythms were regulated by both an SCN pacemaker and MAO.

Additionally, Honma and her research group at Hokkaido University found daily rhythms of PER2 protein in nasal mucus. PER2 peaks at the beginning of the dark period of each circadian cycle and could potentially be linked to seasonal allergies. The Honma group suggested the use of corticoids to treat allergies during the early evening, when they are least likely to interrupt the cycling PER2 levels and the circadian clock in the nose.

Sato Honma and Ken-ichi Honma wanted to determine how seasonality in behavior is regulated by the circadian oscillator in rodents’ behavior by examining how clock genes Per1 and Bmal1 expression is associated with the phase of activity onset and offset. They used bioluminescent reporters for each gene, Per1-dLuc and Bmal1-dLuc to monitor their circadian rhythms in freely moving mice. They also administered light pulses and measured the rate of phase shifts for both the rhythms. They found that Per1-dLuc rhythm was delayed instantly in response to the light pulse while that of Bmal1-dLuc was delayed gradually, close to the time of activity offset in mice. These two different responses to light occurred in the same slice of a SCN and allowed them to conclude that the two clock genes Per1 and Bmal1 were regulated by different molecular mechanisms and that there are two different circadian oscillators corresponding to activity onset, known as E and M oscillators.
