= Kiyohiro Houkin =

Hokkaido University president

Houkin Kiyohiro (寳金 清博, 24 September 1954 – ) is a Japanese medical scientist and neurosurgeon. He has served as the President of Hokkaido University since 2020, where he is also Professor Emeritus. He holds a Doctor of Medicine degree from Hokkaido University, specializing in neurosurgery, and is one of the pioneers in the research of moyamoya disease.

== Biography ==
After graduating from the Faculty of Medicine, Hokkaido University, Houkin was employed at Hokkaido University Hospital. In 1986, he took up a position as a visiting researcher at the University of California, Davis. After returning to Japan in 1990, he earned a Doctor of Medicine from Hokkaido University in 1991. Thereafter, he has been continuously affiliated with Hokkaido University and Hokkaido University Hospital, culminating in his appointment as Director of Hokkaido University Hospital and Vice President of Hokkaido University in April 2017, and as President of Hokkaido University in October 2020. He was a MEXT Overseas Research Fellow at Stanford University and Royal Neurological Institute (now the National Hospital for Neurology and Neurosurgery), UK, for three months beginning November 1996. He has also held the position of Professor, School of Medicine, Sapporo Medical University, since 2001.

He conducted brain metabolism research using magnetic resonance methods under the guidance of Professor Tsutomu Nakata ja at the University of California, Davis [citation needed]. In clinical work, he specializes in cerebral revascularization and surgical treatment of moyamoya disease; in research, regenerative medicine using bone marrow stem cells. He is also a member of the Science Council of Japan and has made expert recommendations on dementia.

== President of Hokkaido University ==
In October 2020, he became the 20th President of Hokkaido University, the first clinician to be appointed to the position. Under the slogan 'Shining a Light from Hokkaido upon the World', the university announced its commitment to university reform by improving its finances and strengthening its research capabilities.

In July 2023, under Houkin's initiative, Hokkaido University published its medium-term vision 'HU VISION 2030'. and proposed the 'Novel Japan University Model' as the type of university it should aim to become by 2030, which uses education and research as its assets to generate social co-creation and bring about a large social impact. In HU VISION 2030, strengthening research capabilities is positioned as an important objective, while science and technology, innovation and Top 10% papers produced by research capabilities are referred to as 'excellence'. The ability to spread the results of such research to society and solve local and regional problems is called 'Extension', and the university aims to establish the Novel Japan University Model through both Excellence and Extension, and to realize the common global goal of a 'sustainable wellbeing in society.'

To develop its research capabilities, the university promotes collaboration with strategic international partner universities such as the University of Melbourne, and participates in the Hokkaido University Alliance.

It is also committed to the promotion of sustainability, having established the Institute for the Advancement of Sustainability in 2021. In 2022, Hokkaido University was ranked first overall in Japan and tenth in the world in THE Impact Ranking of universities' contribution to the SDGs, compiled by the British higher education magazine Times Higher Education (THE), and has been ranked first in Japan for five consecutive years since 2019.

Under his leadership, Hokkaido University has also focused on human resource development, advanced research and industry-university collaboration in the field of advanced semiconductors. The University established the Semiconductor Center Formation Promotion Headquarters on campus in October 2023 and concluded a collaboration agreement with Tohoku University in January 2024 to develop human resources and improve research capabilities in the same field. In June 2024, it concluded a comprehensive collaboration agreement with Rapidus Corporation, a semiconductor company operating in Chitose City, Hokkaido and agreed to strengthen its collaboration system with National Yang-Ming Chiao Tung University in Taiwan; in August 2024, it concluded an agreement with the Rensselaer Polytechnic Institute in the US for research and human resource development in the semiconductor field.

== Anecdotes ==
Houkin was inspired to become a doctor by the Wada heart transplant case ja at Sapporo Medical University.

== Awards ==
Houkin's achievements have been recognized through a number of awards, including the 22nd Kanae Medical Encouragement Award (December 1993), the Japan Society for Stroke Surgery Award (Suzuki Award, April 1999), the Hokkaido Medical Association Award and Hokkaido Governor's Award (September 2007), the Mihara Award from the Mihara Cerebrovascular Disorders Research Promotion Fund of Public Trust (February 2013), the Japanese Society of Neurosurgery Makoto Saito Award (October 2017), and the Taro Ito Academic Award (October 2018).

== Selected works ==
=== Books ===
- Cell Therapy Against Cerebral Stroke: Comprehensive Reviews for Translational Researches and Clinical Trials (edited by Houkin Kiyohiro, Abe Koji, Kuroda Satoshi, Springer 2017), ISBN 9784431560579
- Moyamoya Disease Explored Through RNF213 (edited by Akio Koizumi, Kazuhiro Nagata, Kiyohiro Houkin, Teiji Tominaga, Susumu Miyamoto, Shigeo Kure, Elizabeth Tournier-Lasserve, Springer, 2017), ISBN 9789811027116

Academic Papers

- Kiyohiro Houkin, Masaki Ito, Taku Sugiyama, Hideo Shichinohe, Naoki Nakayama, Ken Kazumata, Satoshi Kuroda "Review of Past Research and Current Concepts on the Etiology of Moyamoya Disease" NEUROLOGIA MEDICO-CHIRURGICA 52(5), 267-277, 2012. doi:10.2176/nmc.52.267. PMID 22688062
- Kiyohiro Houkin, Hideo Shichinohe, Koji Abe, Teruyo Arato, Mari Dezawa, Osamu Honmou, Nobutaka Horie, Yasuo Katayama, Kohsuke Kudo, Satoshi Kuroda, Tomohiro Matsuyama, Ichiro Miyai, Izumi Nagata, Kuniyasu Niizuma, Ken Sakushima, Masanori Sasaki, Norihiro Sato, Kenji Sawanobori, Satoshi Suda, Akihiko Taguchi, Teiji Tominaga, Haruko Yamamoto, Toru Yamashita, Toshiki Yoshimine,"Accelerating Cell Therapy for Stroke in Japan: Regulatory Framework and Guidelines on Development of Cell-Based Products" Stroke 49(4), e145-e152, 2018. doi:10.1161/STROKEAHA.117.019216 PMID 29581346
