= Ken-Ichi Honma =

Japanese chronobiologist

Ken-Ichi Honma (born in November 10, 1946) is a Japanese chronobiologist who researches the biological mechanisms underlying circadian rhythms. After graduating from Hokkaido University School of Medicine, he practiced clinical psychiatry before beginning his research. His recent research efforts are centered around photic and non-photic entrainment, the structure of circadian clocks, and the ontogeny of circadian clocks. He often collaborates with his wife, Sato Honma, on work involving the mammalian suprachiasmatic nucleus (SCN).

He was born in Sapporo, Hokkaido, and currently lives with Sato Honma, his wife, in Japan, with their only daughter.

Honma serves as the chairman of the Keiaikai Sapporo Hanazono Hospital, and is a professor emeritus at Hokkaido University.

== Education and career ==
In 1971, Honma received his Doctorate of Medicine and then his Ph.D. in Medicine in 1977 from the Hokkaido University School of Medicine. He worked as an assistant professor at Hokkaido University until 1978, when he left to perform research at the Max-Planck Institute in Andechs, Germany, as a postdoctoral fellow. He first worked with Professor Wolfgang Wuttke in Göttingen, then with Jürgen Aschoff. In 1983, Honma was promoted to associate professor and began working on experiments involving the human circadian clock in temporal isolation. In 1992, he became a full-time professor at the Hokkaido University School of Medicine.

Honma was the former vice-president of the Japanese Society of Sleep Research (2007–2021), the former council chair of the Japanese Society for Chronobiology (2005–2011).

He is the vice-president of the Asian Society of Sleep Research (ASRS), the prior Editor-in-Chief of Sleep and Biological Rhythms, an English Journal of the Japanese Society of Sleep Research and the Asian Society of Sleep Research, and an associate member of the Science Council of Japan. Since 2016, Honma has also been a member of The Committee of ChronoHistory. Honma is the chairman of the Sapporo Symposium on Biological Rhythms (1995–present), which holds an international symposium centered around chronobiology biannually. He served as the head of a Japan-U.S. joint project on Biological Timing, where he was responsible for sending many Japanese scientists to the United States (1993–1995). While he was the president-elect of the Japanese Society of Chronobiology (2005 to 2010), he co-organized the biannual meetings of the European Biological Rhythms Society (EBRS) and held the first world congress of chronobiology in 2003 at Sapporo as the founding president of the World Federation for Societies of Chronobiology (2001–2011). He has tried to establish a forum among Chronobiologists in Asia as the council chief of the Asian Forum on Chronobiology (2015).

=== Awards and honors ===
In 2020, Honma received the SRBR Director’s Award for mentoring. The SRBR Award honors members of the Society for Research on Biological Rhythms for their contributions.

== Scientific contributions ==
Honma has authored over 200 scholarly articles and has published several edited volumes in the field of chronobiology.

Initially, his research revolved around understanding the photic and non-photic entrainment of circadian rhythms and raised hypotheses about the role of feeding in the entrainment of the circadian clock, as well as the ways in which endogenous rhythms can entrain to artificial bright light before later focusing on uncovering the structure of the circadian clock. Earlier in his career, Honma made the discovery that body temperature, locomotor activity, and plasma levels of corticosterone—all circadian processes—are likely coupled to one common internal oscillator in rats. However, his current research is centered around the ontogeny of circadian rhythms and understanding the physiological aspects of chronobiology.

=== Earlier works ===
Honma described "a phase response curve (PRC) to a single bright light pulse in human subjects living under isolation." He developed a model in animals for a sleep-wake cycle that is desynchronized from other circadian rhythms in the body such as the plasma levels of melatonin.

Honma and his wife, Sato Honma, were able to detect circadian rhythms in Bmal1 gene expression via in situ hybridization in the SCN of rats. They found that BMAL1 expression was highest during the subjective night in rats and that rhythms of mRNA expression were found in other regions of the brain, like the hippocampus and the cerebellum.

=== Later works ===
In 2014, Honma and his colleagues published a paper that highlighted the effects of postnatal light on cryptochrome-deficient mice. The authors showed that exposure to constant light by placing newborn mice in constant light for three weeks after they were born can partially restore rhythms in the SCN, even though the mice lose sleep-wake rhythms upon weaning.

In 2016, he published an article that emphasized the role of physical activity, specifically in blind and elderly people, in the entrainment of circadian rhythms. The authors demonstrated that physical activity could also shift the plasma levels of melatonin.

In 2017, Ken-Ichi and Sato Honma were part of the team at Hokkaido University that discovered that voltage rhythms in the SCN were synchronized, a finding that became the basis for the theory that the SCN utilizes these synchronized rhythms in order to maintain tissue-wide rhythm.

In 2019, Honma, with his collaborators, uncovered the role of GABAergic neurons in inhibiting cells in the suprachiasmatic nucleus (the central oscillator in mammals). They concluded that GABA neither establishes nor maintains circadian patterns in the body, but rather that it "refine[s] the circadian firing rhythm to ensure noiseless communications with neurons outside the SCN."

Honma has also been involved with recent research about ultradian rhythms, which are short-term rhythms with short-lasting periods. He has shown that in constant dark conditions, ultradian rhythms can be observed in the SCN, and that the expression of Per1, Per2 and Bmal1—which are central clock genes in mammals—shows ultradian fluctuations and periods of approximately 3 hours. The research team also showed that these rhythms are most likely endogenous, or that they do not rely on external cues to be generated. Overall, the team concluded that ultradian rhythms had no correlation with the animal's physical activity rhythms, but further research is still needed.

Honma was a prominent anti-daylight savings movement-person in Japan, advocating against the establishment of daylight-savings time in Japan by educating people on the detrimental health effects associated with the misalignment of the body's clock and the light-dark cycles (zeitgebers). Currently, Japan does not have any daylight saving time system in place.
