= Sechi Katō =

Japanese chemist

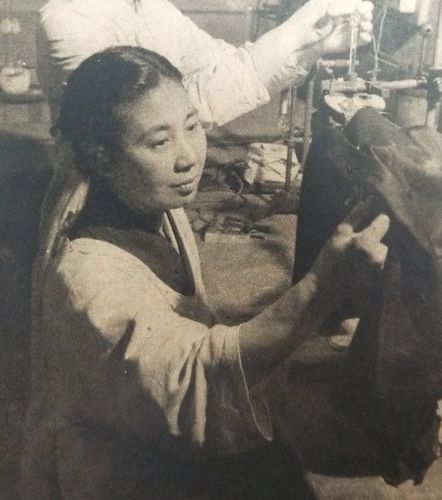
- Katō at the RIKEN laboratory in 1948
- Born: 2 October 1893; Oshikiri Village (now Mikawa), Yamagata, Japan
- Died: 29 March 1989 (aged 95); Tokyo
- Education: Women's Normal School (now Ochanomizu University); Hokkaido University; Kyoto University
- Known for: Developing spectrometric analysis of organic materials in Japan; First female chief scientist at RIKEN
- Scientific career
- Workplaces: Hokkaido University; RIKEN

Sechi Katō (1893–1989) was a chemist who became the first woman to be a principal investigator at RIKEN, Japan's national Institute of Chemical and Physical Research. Katō was the first female student at Hokkaido University, and the third woman Doctor of Science in Japan. She developed spectrometric analysis of organic materials in Japan.

Katō faced personal adversity as well as gender barriers. When she was a baby, her mother and two of her siblings were killed when their house caught fire after collapsing in an earthquake. Her father died a few years later at the age of 43. Katō married young and had two children, one of whom died in battle in World War II. She lived to the age of 95.

== Early life and education ==
Sechi Katō was born on 2 October 1893 in a wealthy farming family in Oshikiri Village (now Mikawa) in Yamagata prefecture. In October the following year, the family house was destroyed in a major earthquake, with a subsequent fire killing her mother and two of her three siblings. The surviving family began to struggle financially. Her father remarried and had another child, but died aged 43 in 1908, when Sechi was 15.

Katō had been attending the Tsuruoka Women’s High School, but moved to the Yamagata Women’s Higher Normal School after her father's death so that she could become a teacher and help support the family. She graduated in 1911 and began teaching. However Katō's stepmother, Kin, encouraged her to go to Tokyo to continue studying. In 1914, she enrolled in the division of science at Tokyo's Women's Normal School (now Ochanomizu University), graduating in 1918. Katō then taught at a high school in Hokkaido, taking a group of students to visit Hokkaido University. There, she heard that although there were no female students, it was not forbidden, so she applied for admission.

There was opposition to her admission, and Katō spent days outside the university president's office, begging to be allowed to study there. She became the first woman to study at Hokkaido University, on a non-degree basis. She began her studies in the Agricultural College in 1918. After graduation, she left her high school teaching job and became an assistant in the University's Department of Agricultural Chemistry.

== Career ==
In 1922, Katō began studying at RIKEN in Tokyo, assigned to Isaburo Wada’s analytical chemistry laboratory. She co-authored her first scientific publication with him in 1923. In 1927, she published her first work using absorption spectroscopy to study the physical chemistry of neodymium salt. She had developed an interest in quantum physics, and while watching a physicist's optical experiment, realised that she could use the technology to study chemicals.

Katō was awarded Doctor of Science from then Kyoto Imperial University in 1931 with a dissertation on polymerization of acetylene, reporting on a series of experiments with spectroscopy revealing molecular structures of a range of compounds. She was the third woman awarded a doctor of science in Japan, and the second in chemistry.

Katō became a research scientist at RIKEN in 1942, and in 1953, became the first woman to achieve the position of principal investigator at RIKEN. During World War II, RIKEN scientists directed their attention to the war effort, including Katō. After the war, she worked on analysing the recently discovered drugs, penicillin and streptomycin, including developing pure streptomycin crystals. She would remain there until her full retirement in 1960. For the next 15 years, she gave regular free science seminars to high school science teachers and early career researchers, for which she received an award from the Chemical Society of Japan.

During the 1950s, Katō helped establish groups supporting women in science, including the Japanese Society of Women Scientists, formed in 1958, as well as employing women scientists in her laboratory. In 2018, RIKEN launched the Sechi Katō Program to recruit women researchers early in their careers.

== Personal life ==
Katō married an architect from her home town, Sato Tokusaburo, in 1921, and gave birth to a son in 1921, a daughter in 1924, and another daughter in 1931. Her stepmother, Kin, lived with the family so that Katō could continue working. Katō's son died in the battle of Iwo Jima in 1945. Her husband died in 1959.

In 1968, Katō was the first person granted honorary citizen of her hometown. She died after a stroke at her home in Tokyo on 29 March 1989, at the age of 95.
