= Hokkaido University =

University in Sapporo, Hokkaido, Japan

- 北海道大学
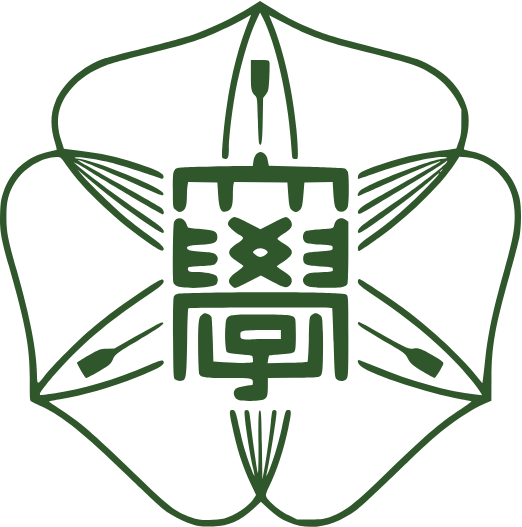
- Motto: 少年よ、大志を抱け
- Motto in English: "Boys, Be Ambitious"
- Type: Public (National)
- Established: Founded September 1876 (as Sapporo Agricultural College), Chartered April 1, 1918
- President: Kiyohiro Houkin
- Administrative staff: 6,250
- Undergraduates: 11,935 (2017)
- Postgraduates: 6,336 (2017)
- Other students: 89 research students (2017)
- Location: Sapporo, Hokkaido, Japan
- Campus: Urban, 3.0 km^{2}
- Colors: Leaf Green
- Nickname: Hokudai
- Mascot: None
- Website: www.hokudai.ac.jp

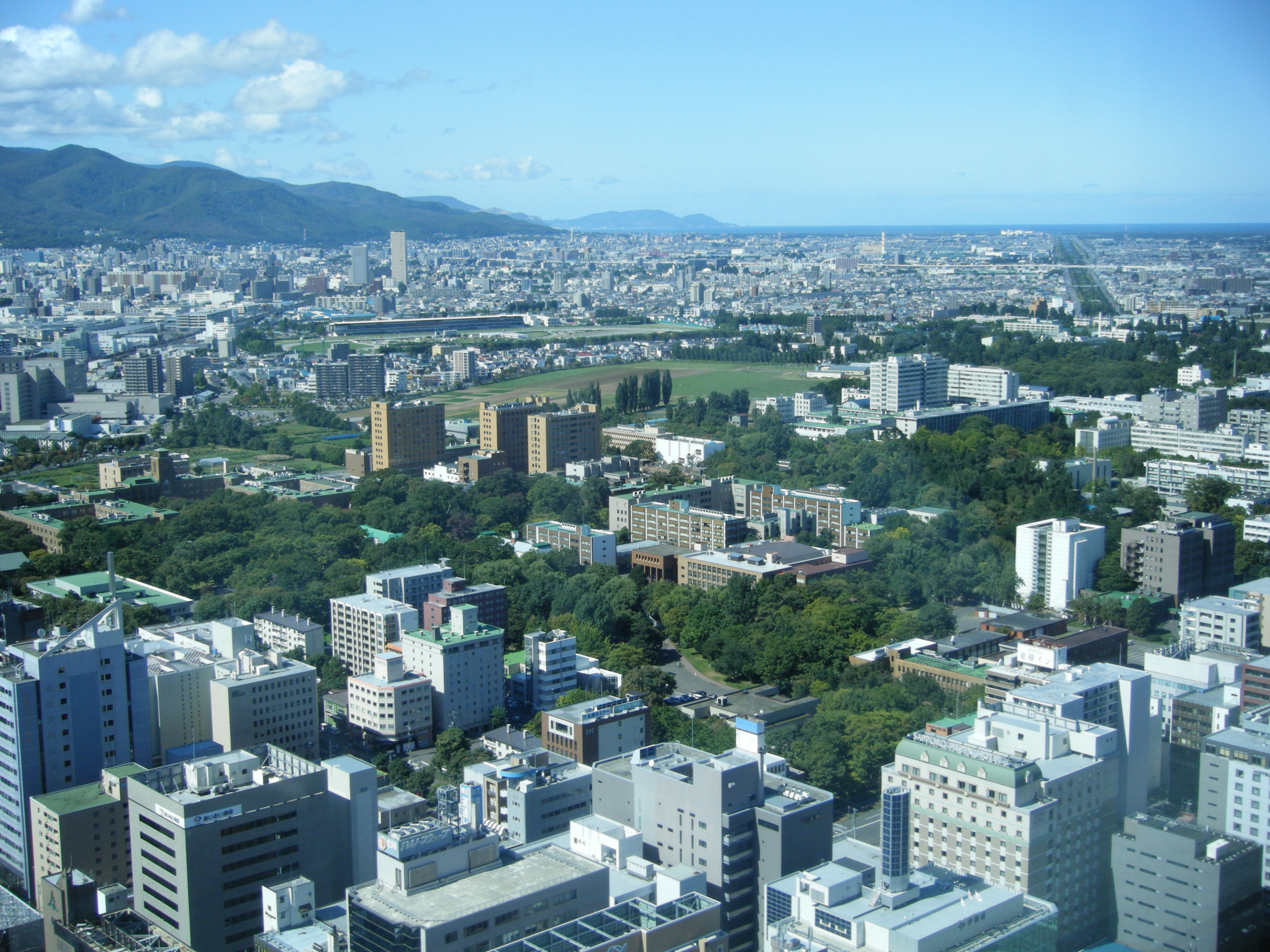
Hokkaido University, September 2009

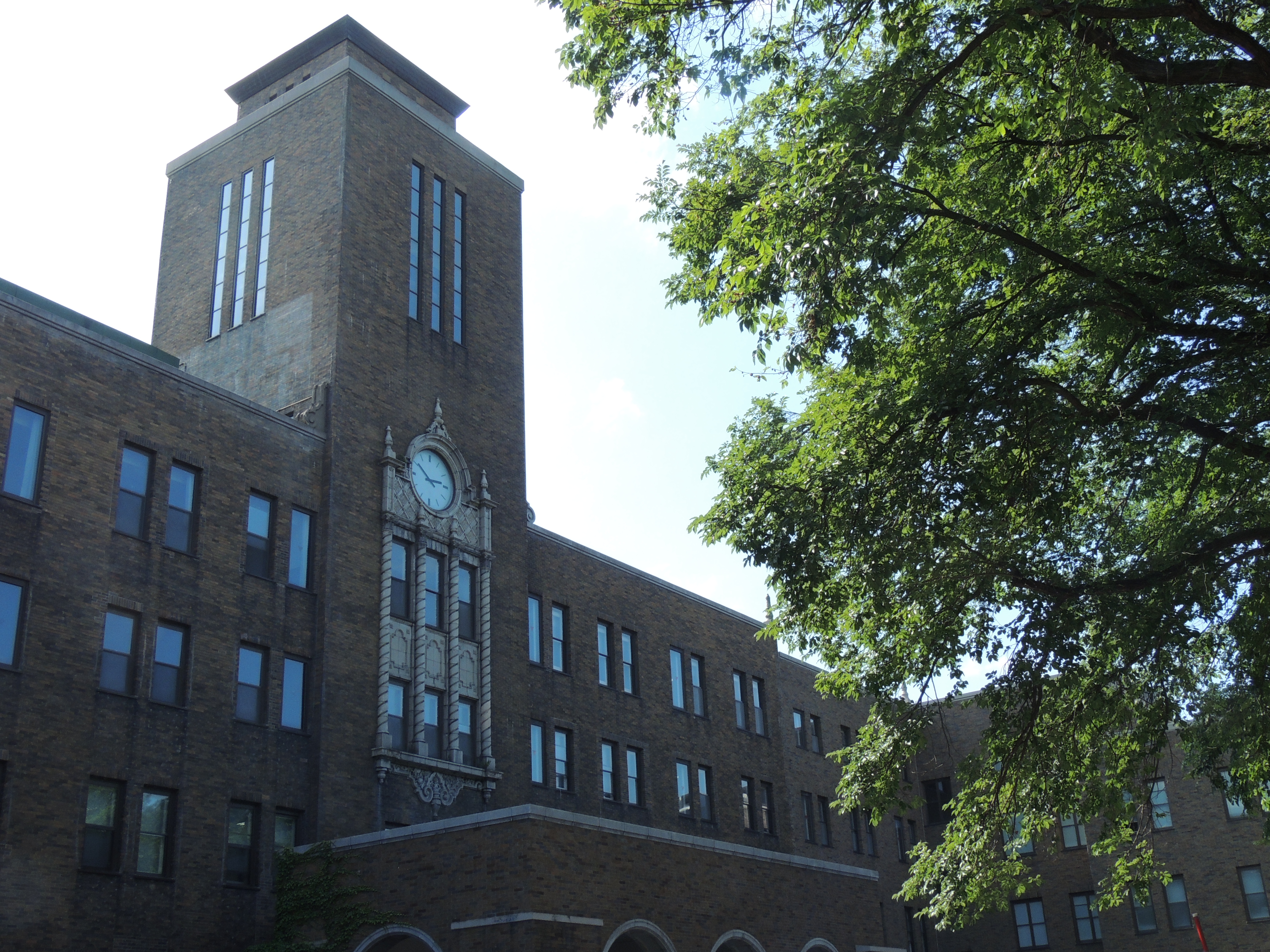
The Hokkaido University clocktower

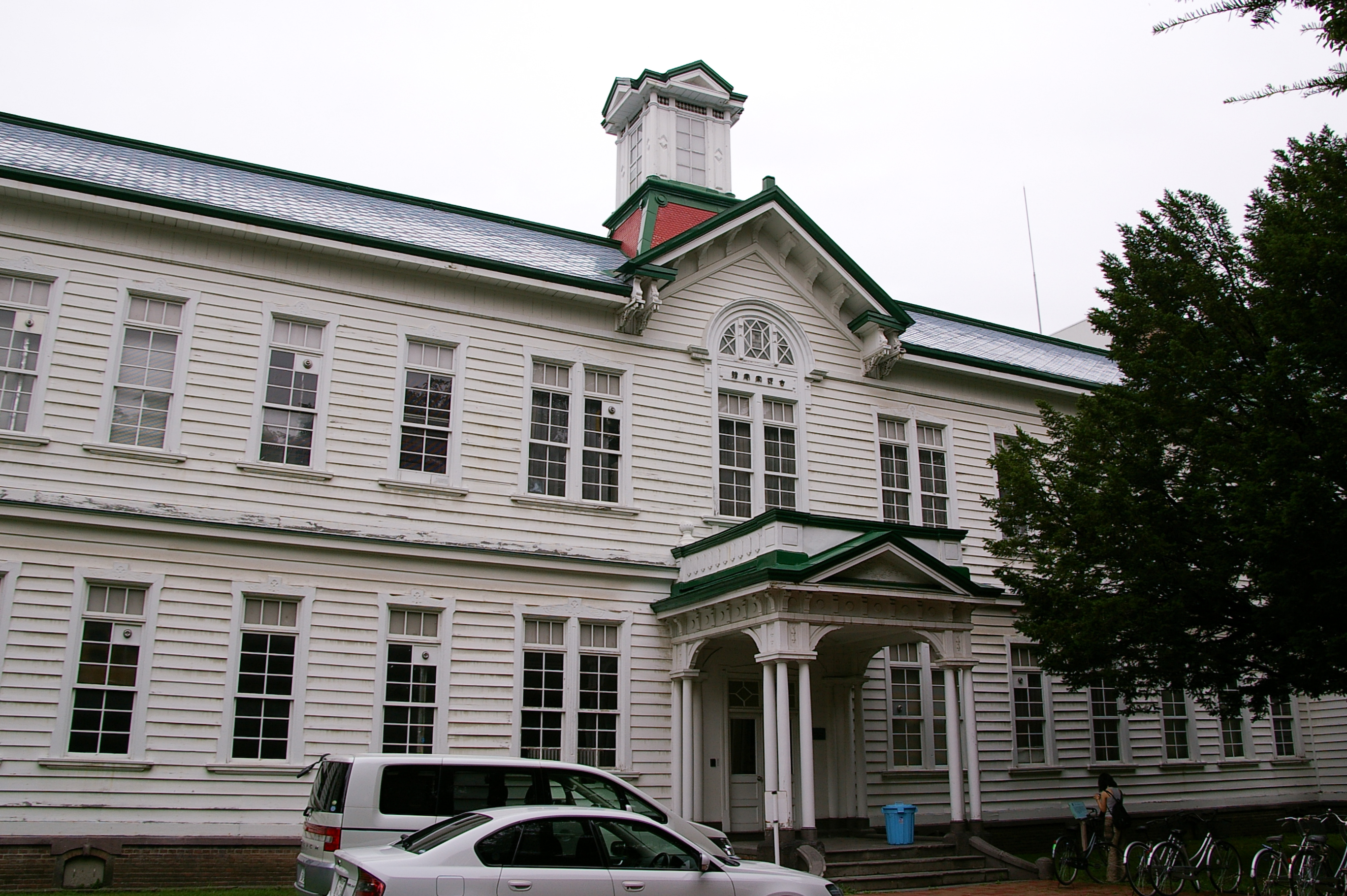
Hokkaido University Furukawa Hall

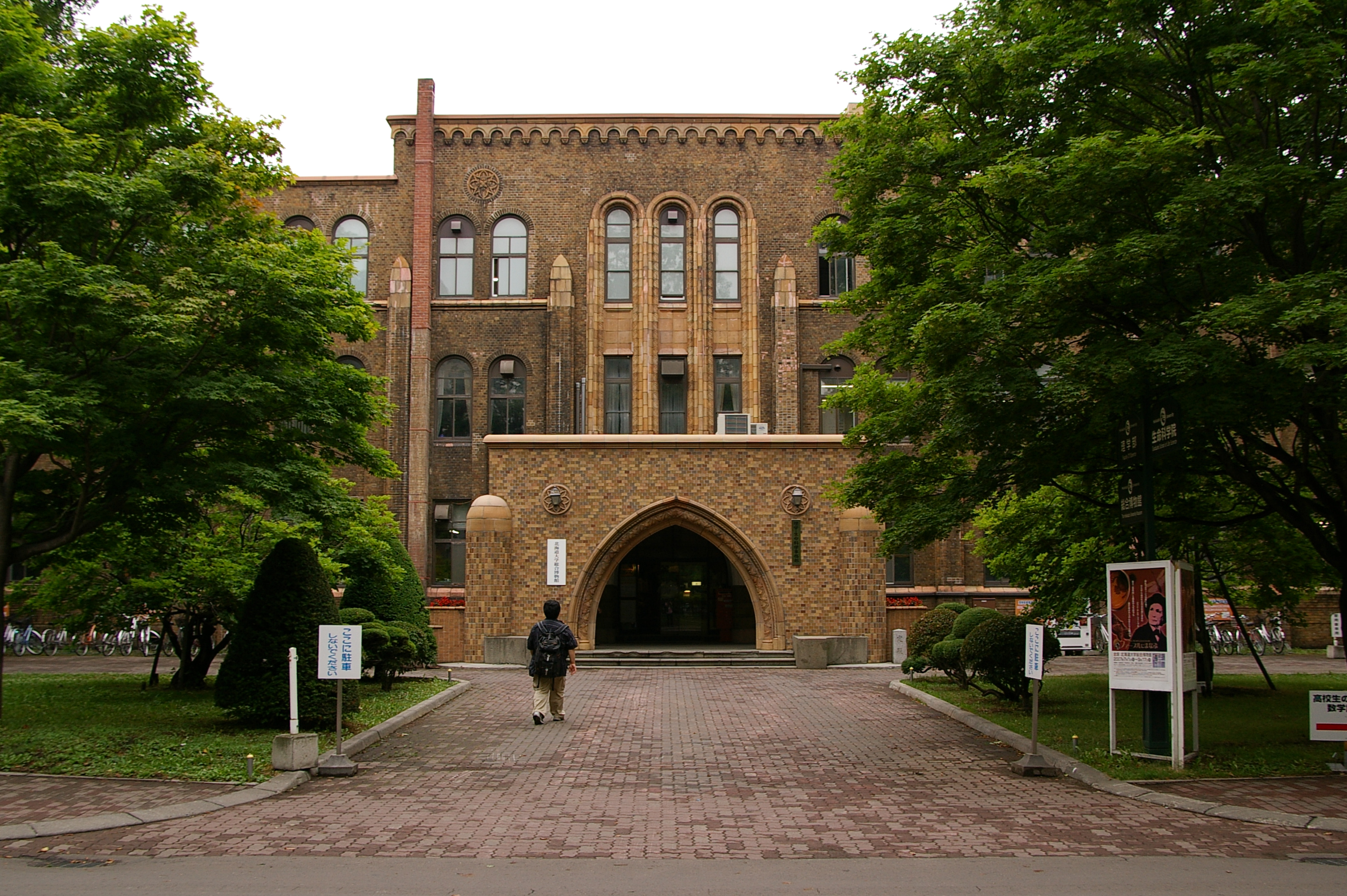
The Hokkaido University Museum

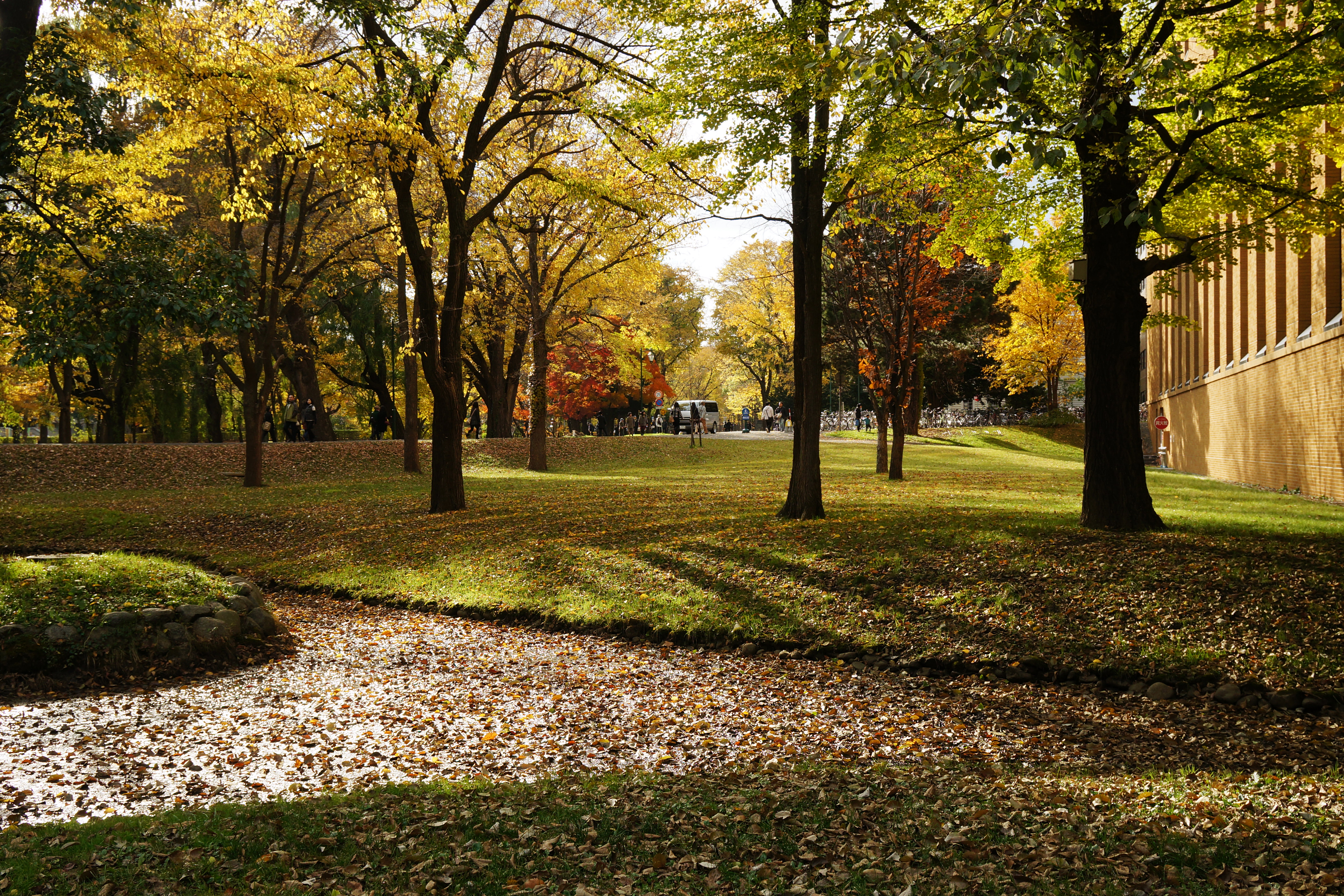
Near the library at Sapporo Campus

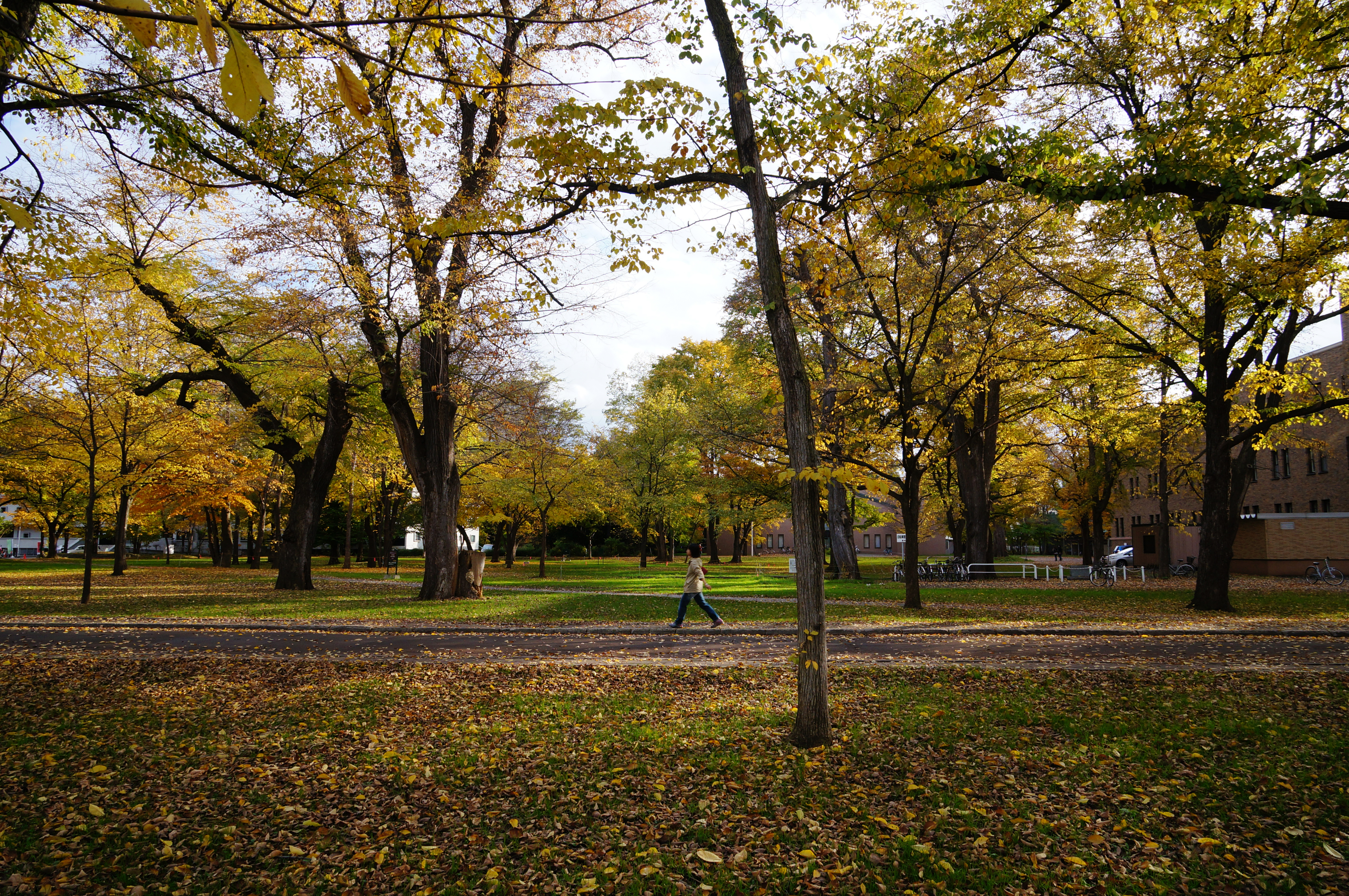
Forest Elm at Sapporo Campus

Hokkaido University (北海道大学, Hokkaidō daigaku), or Hokudai (北大), is a public research university in Sapporo, Hokkaido, Japan. Founded in 1918, it is the fifth-oldest government-authorised university in Japan and one of the former Imperial Universities.

The university finds its roots in Sapporo Agricultural College, which was a pioneer in the country's modern agricultural education and research, founded in 1876. The university's motto is 'Boys, Be Ambitious', which is said to be the parting words of the American dean of the Agricultural College, William S. Clark.

The university has 12 undergraduate faculties and 21 postgraduate schools. The university mainly operates on two campuses: the main campus is located in downtown Sapporo, just north of Sapporo Station, and the other campus is located in Hakodate, primarily used by the Faculty of Fishery Sciences.

== History ==
The history of the university dates to the formal incorporation of Yezo as Hokkaido into the Japanese realm. Director of the Hokkaidō Development Commission Kuroda Kiyotaka, having traveled to America in 1870, looked to the American model of settling the new lands. Upon return he brought General Horace Capron, a commissioner of agriculture who pushed for the adoption of new agricultural practices and crops in Hokkaido's colder clime. To achieve this an agriculture college was proposed, leading to the founding of Sapporo Agricultural College (札幌農學校, Sapporo nōgakkō) in 1876 by William S. Clark with the help of five faculty members and a first class size of 24 students. In September 1907, Tohoku Imperial University (東北帝國大學, Tōhoku teikoku daigaku) set up the faculty of Agriculture in Sapporo. Tohoku Imperial University ceded the Faculty of Agriculture to Hokkaido Imperial University (北海道帝國大學, Hokkaidō teikoku daigaku) on April 1, 1918. It was one of nine Imperial Universities. In 1918, Sechi Katō became the first woman student admitted to the University.

The School of Medicine was established in 1919, at which time the Agricultural College became the Faculty of Agriculture. This was followed by the Faculty of Engineering, the Faculty of Science, and finally in 1947, the Faculty of Law and Literature. The current name of Hokkaido University also came into use in 1947. In 1953, the Graduate School was established.

Since 2004 the university has been incorporated as a National University Corporation under a new law which applies to all national universities. Although the incorporation has led to increased financial independence and autonomy, Hokkaido University is still partially controlled by the Japanese Ministry of Education.

In 2014 the university was selected under the Super Global Universities program that began as an initiative of Prime Minister Shinzo Abe who stated its aim was to help more of Japan's universities rank in the top 100 worldwide. Under the program, it is listed in the top university category or Type A—(Top Type). The Top Type is for world-class universities that have the potential to be ranked in the top 100 in world university rankings. Each Type A university will receive ¥420 million ($US 4.2 million) annually until 2023.

In June 2020, Hokkaido University president Toyoharu Nawa was dismissed by Japanese education minister Koichi Hagiuda for abuse of power at the workplace, becoming the first national university president to be dismissed since national universities became independent in 2004. He was succeeded by former neurosurgeon and director of Hokkaido University Hospital Kiyohiro Houkin.

On August 27, 2026, a male graduate student of the Faculty of Science was killed in an accident involving exposure to hydrofluoric acid. Additionally, two other students were injured while attempting to provide him with medical assistance.

== Faculties and graduate schools ==
=== Faculties ===
- Letters
- Education
- Law
- Economics
- Medicine
- Health Sciences (radiation technology, laboratory technology, physical therapy, occupational therapy)
- Nursing
- Dental medicine
- Engineering
- Veterinary medicine
- Fisheries sciences
- Agriculture
- Pharmaceutical sciences
- Science (mathematics, physics, chemistry, biology, biological chemistry, earth and planetary sciences)

=== Graduate schools ===
- Agriculture
- Biomedical Science and Engineering
- Chemical Sciences and Engineering
- Dental Medicine
- Economics and Business
- Education
- Engineering
- Environmental Science
- Fisheries Sciences
- Global Food Resources
- Health Sciences
- Information Science and Technology
- Infectious Diseases
- International Media, Communication, and Tourism Studies
- Law
- Letters
- Life Science
- Medicine
- Pharmaceutical Sciences
- Public Policy
- Science
- Veterinary Medicine

=== Postgraduate degree programs in English ===
The following departments offer postgraduate degrees taught entirely in English

- Agriculture
- Chemical Sciences and Engineering
- Engineering
- Environmental Science
- Life Sciences
- Science
- Veterinary Medicine

Both international and domestic students may apply for graduate programs taught in English. Competitive scholarships are available for all graduate and undergraduate students enrolled in English degree programs, which range in amount from tuition discounts to full funding.

=== Special degree programs for international students ===
The university offers two programs aimed exclusively at international students: One, four-year undergraduate degree program, the Modern Japanese Studies Program (MJSP), and one, five-year degree program comprising both undergraduate- and graduate-level study, the Integrated Science Program (ISP). As with other English-based degree programs at the university, competitive scholarships are available for all graduate and undergraduate students, which range in amount from tuition discounts to full funding.

==== Modern Japanese Studies Program (MJSP) ====
The Modern Japanese Studies Program is a bilingual, bachelor's degree program that aims to educate students about the history, culture, society, and political economy of modern Japan while raising them to fluency in the Japanese language. The program offers two majors, one in History and Culture and one in Society and Political Economy. The majors share coursework, so whichever of the previous specializations a student does not choose as their major becomes their minor.

==== Integrated Science Program (ISP) ====
The Integrated Science Program is a multifaceted degree program that aims to provide students with a bachelor's degree in either physics, chemistry, or biology. Upon enrolling, students will spend the first semester attaining an all-round education in the three sciences along with mathematics and Japanese language. After this intensive first semester, students will join the department of Physics, chemistry or biology within the school of science. The final allocation is decided by a combination of student preference, availability and GPA. Japanese language education continues until the first semester of the second year. After graduation, students have the choice of enrolling in one of Hokkaido University's graduate schools. Through the unique, accelerated methodology of the program, students are able to graduate with a master's degree in five years (made up of three-and-a-half years of undergraduate study and one-and-a-half years of graduate study and research). All classes, besides Japanese language, are carried out in English by professors with native or fully professional proficiency.

=== Institutes ===
The university's Institute of Seismology and Volcanology was founded in 1998 in collaboration with several seismological observatories around Hokkaido. The institute is represented on the national Coordinating Committee for Earthquake Prediction.

In 2016, the university launched the Hokkaido Summer Institute, a three-month-long program from June to August which offers a variety of classes for both undergraduate and graduate students. Guest lecturers are invited from all over the world to share their expertise for the courses, which usually run for 1–2 weeks and grant students a small amount of academic credit. Both Japanese and foreign students participate in this unique program, which is conducted entirely in English.

== Campus ==
=== Sapporo campus ===
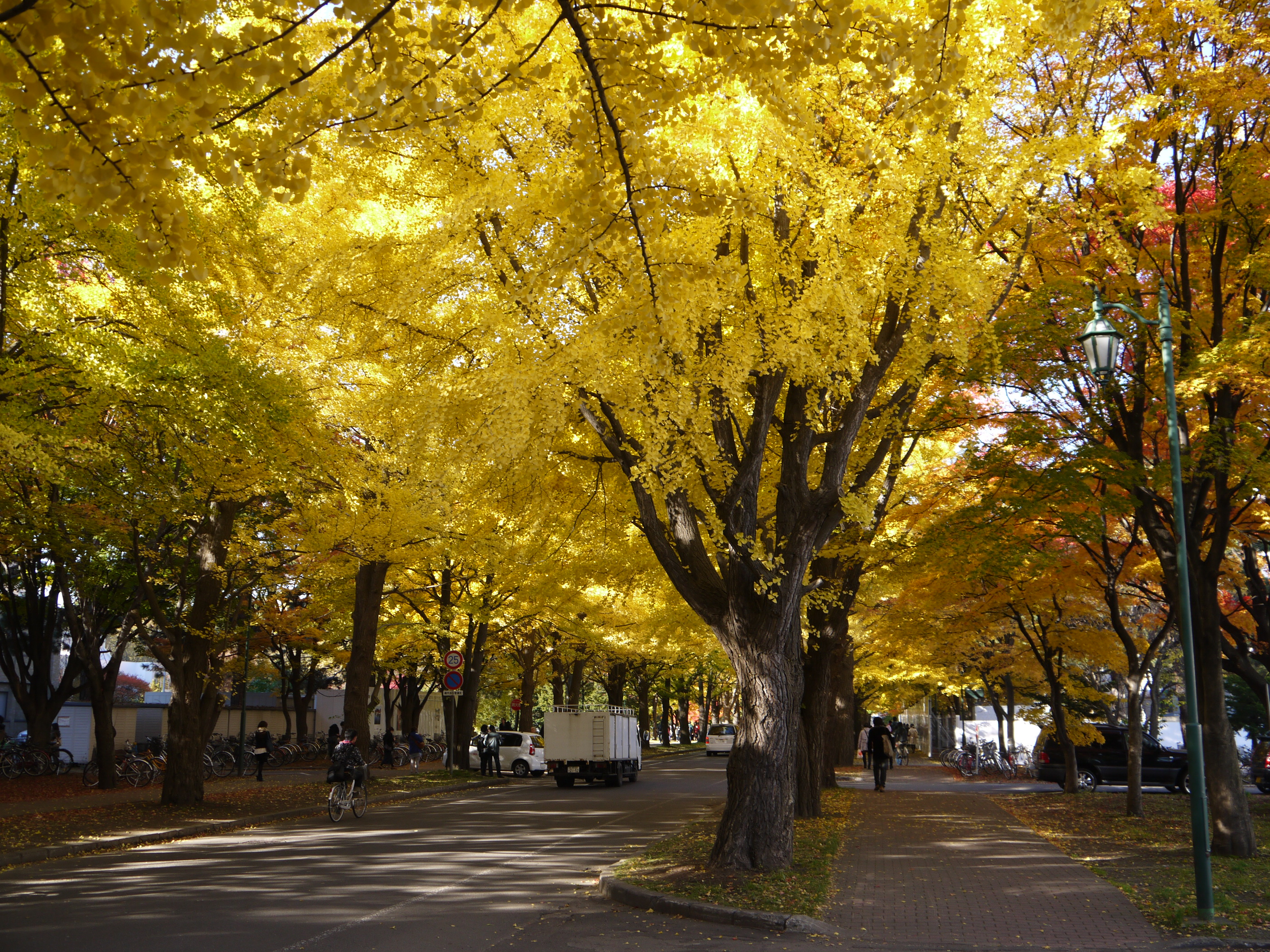
Golden ginkgo trees line the street at Hokkaido University in fall.

The main Sapporo campus is located just north of Sapporo Station, in the heart of Sapporo City. The entirety of the campus measures approximately 180 hectares and houses academic and administrative buildings, research laboratories, student dormitories, and farmland. The main academic buildings are found along a 1.5 kilometer stretch of road that runs from the Main Gate to the Kita 18 Gate, roughly encompassing the distance between Kita-Juni-Jo and Kita 18-jo subway stations on the Namboku Subway Line. A campus-wide bus service runs regular routes between the southern and northern end of the university, although access is restricted to university staff only.

The abundance of accessible green space has continued to be popular not only among students, but also the general public, who can often be seen using the campus area in a similar way to a public park. Walking tours of the campus for interested foreign and domestic tourists are provided by several businesses in Sapporo, although no tour is needed to visit the campus. Fall is an especially popular time for campus visits, with tourists and Sapporo residents flocking to get a view of the golden ginkgo trees that line Ginkgo Avenue.

=== Hakodate campus ===
The campus is located in Hakodate, a city located in the southern part of Hokkaidō. The Faculty and Graduate School of Fisheries Science are located there. However, students of Fisheries Science start their education at the Sapporo campus in order to complete three semesters of compulsory liberal arts education courses and move to the Hakodate campus from the second semester of their sophomore year. As the minimum requirement to study at the Hakodate campus is only one year of a four-year bachelor's program, the turn-over rate of students entering and leaving the Hakodate campus is fairly high. To provide students in the Faculty and Graduate School of Fisheries Science with practical hands-on experience, the university has two fully operational research vessels, the Oshoru Maru and the Ushio Maru, based in nearby Hakodate harbor. Graduate students and professors also use these vessels to carry out their research.

=== Overseas satellite offices ===
In order to raise awareness of the university internationally, as of June 2018 Hokkaido University was operating eight satellite offices worldwide. After opening its first overseas satellite office in Seoul, South Korea, Hokkaido University has also established satellite offices in Helsinki (Finland), Beijing (China), Lusaka (Zambia), Bandung (Indonesia), Quezon City (Philippines), Kamphaeng Saen (Thailand), and a special China Office in Beijing. Interested parties can not only obtain information regarding the university at these offices, but prospective students can also take university entrance exams there, a procedure which previously was only offered in Japan.

== International collaboration ==
The university is an active member of the University of the Arctic. UArctic is an international cooperative network based in the Circumpolar Arctic region, consisting of more than 200 universities, colleges, and other organizations with an interest in promoting education and research in the Arctic region.

== Academic rankings ==
University rankings
Global
THE	General	351–400
QS	General	=170
ARWU	Research	201–300

Regional
THE Asia (Asia version)	General	=82
QS Asia (Asia version)	General	35
ARWU Asia	Research	19–26

National

Program rankings
Social Sciences & Humanities

LAW

Natural Sciences & Technology

Engineering
Kawaijuku National	General	6
QS World	General	135

MATERIALS SCIENCE
T.Reuters National	Research	7
T.Reuters World	Research	86

CHEMISTRY
T.Reuters National	Research	8
T.Reuters World	Research	52

BIOLOGY & BIOCHEMISTRY
T.Reuters National	Research	6
T.Reuters World	Research	104
- * T. Reuters World rankings include non-educational institutions

=== General rankings ===
In 2017, the CWTS Leiden Ranking ranked them at 120th in the world and 6th in Japan. In 2018, QS World University Rankings ranked Hokkaido University at 122nd in the world (7th in Japan).

In 2019, the Times Higher Education(THE) Japan ranked them 5th in Japan. Also in that year, they ranked as 6th or 7th in Japan according to the Academic Ranking of World Universities (ARWU), and between 151st and 200th in the world.

In 2013, their highest score in QS Ranking was for Faculty Student Score (88 out of 100). Their lowest was for International Faculty Score (13.5 out of 100). In an effort to boost their International Faculty Score, Hokkaido has recently been selected to be part of Japan's Super Global Universities Program. This program provides special funding to hire international faculty.

=== Research performance ===
In the Nature index 2023 annual table, Hokkaido University was ranked 142nd for its output in selected journals in the fields of natural sciences and Health Sciences research, among all leading research institutions in the world (5th in Japan).

=== Popularity and selectivity ===
Hokkaido University's selectivity for undergraduate degrees is usually regarded as amongst the top 15 in the country.

== Notable people ==
- Uchimura Kanzō, Christian evangelist, founder of Non-church Christianity Movement
- Akira Ifukube, composer
- Nitobe Inazō, the author of Bushido: the Soul of Japan, a Quaker
- Ryuzo Yanagimachi, assisted fertilization and cloning pioneer
- Mamoru Mohri, astronaut
- Takeo Arishima, novelist
- Riko Muranaka, medical doctor and journalist
- Hiroshi Ishii, computer scientist
- Junko Ohashi, pop singer
- Akira Suzuki, Nobel Prize in Chemistry (2010)
- Yuichiro Miura, alpinist, the oldest person to reach the summit of Mount Everest
- Juhn Atsushi Wada, neurologist, described the Wada test
- Ken-Ichi Honma, chronobiologist, awarded the SRBR award.

=== Nobel Prize recipients ===
As of 2021, two alumni and faculty members have won the Nobel Prize in Chemistry. The university received attention in 2010 when Professor Akira Suzuki won the Nobel Prize for Chemistry jointly with Richard F. Heck and Ei-ichi Negishi. Benjamin List, winner of the 2021 Nobel Prize in Chemistry, is the principal investigator at the Institute for Chemical Reaction Design and Discovery of the Hokkaido University. Also, Ei-ichi Negishi, special invited professor at the Institute for Catalysis (ICAT) of the Hokkaido University, was awarded the Nobel Prize in Chemistry as well.

== Points of interest ==
- Hokkaido University Botanic Garden
