= Food-entrainable oscillator =

The food-entrainable oscillator (FEO) is a circadian clock that can be entrained by varying the time of food presentation. It was discovered when a rhythm was found in rat activity. This was called food anticipatory activity (FAA), and this is when the wheel-running activity of mice decreases after feeding, and then rapidly increases in the hours leading up to feeding. FAA appears to be present in non-mammals (pigeons/fish), but research heavily focuses on its presence in mammals. This rhythmic activity does not require the suprachiasmatic nucleus (SCN), the central circadian oscillator in mammals, implying the existence of an oscillator, the FEO, outside of the SCN, but the mechanism and location of the FEO is not yet known. There is ongoing research to investigate if the FEO is the only non-light entrainable oscillator in the body.

== Discovery ==
In 1922, the study of food anticipatory activity (FAA) began with scientist Curt Richter after he observed a rhythm in the wheel activity of rats in relation to constant feeding times. In his experiment, Richter would feed rats held in constant environmental conditions at noon daily for twenty-five minutes. The wheel activity of the rats was recorded to decrease immediately after feeding, then rapidly increase within 2 to 3 hours before feeding again. This daily 24-hour pattern persisted and was discovered to depend upon the time of food presentation. Richter attributed this behavior to the "clock-like functioning" of the stomach.

The occurrence of anticipatory behavior was confirmed in additional research regarding the effects of daily feeding schedules on both rat and mice behavior. For example, Bolles and deLorge found that rats exposed to a 24-hour light-dark (LD) cycle displayed anticipatory wheel-running activity when maintained under a 24-hour feeding schedule. This same anticipatory rhythm, however, was not maintained under 19 and 29-hour feeding schedules, suggesting that FAA was controlled either by the external 24-hour light cues or by a 24-hour circadian clock. Although, it was soon discovered that rats' activity followed externally imposed light schedules for up to 28-hours, but was lost at 29-hours. Thus, light cues were found to be neither a necessary nor sufficient input to produce anticipatory behavior.

Further research of FAA in the 1970s documented that an autonomous circadian oscillator outside the suprachiasmatic nucleus (SCN) must control the food anticipatory activity. The SCN is a region in the brain known to control circadian rhythms in mammals which can be influenced by external light cues. Researcher Friedrich Stephan established that SCN-lesioned rats maintained in constant light (LL) show anticipatory lever-pressing behavior with feeding schedules under 23 and 25-hours, but not 18 or 30-hour schedules. Anticipatory wheel-running was also observed with feeding schedules under 23-hours, but not with 18-hour schedules. Stephan attributed these results to a circadian oscillator, named the food-entrainable oscillator (FEO), that controls the output of anticipatory behavior. The FEO was determined to be autonomous and circadian because its 24-hour rhythm persisted in constant conditions and could also be entrained to a range of feeding intervals. Results suggested that anticipatory wheel running activity developed within 2–4 days of the experiment and as quickly in rats with SCN lesions than as in the controls. Furthermore, restricted feeding schedules were found to be capable of entraining these circadian oscillators and enabling rats to anticipate a 24-hour feeding schedule. This was an important discovery in the field of circadian biology, as it highlighted the potential existence of other circadian oscillators outside the SCN, which was believed to be the master circadian clock in mammals.

Results in experiments with SCN-lesioned mice demonstrated that lesions of the SCN abolish free-running and light-dark (LD) entrained behavioral rhythms, but do not interfere with the development of anticipatory wheel-running or lever-pressing behavior. Thus, the FEO must be located outside of the SCN. Other experiments have also concluded that the FEO does not exist in dozens of other brain regions, although the anatomical location of the FEO remains an unsolved circadian mystery.

== Mechanism ==
The components of a circadian clock are the input, pacemaker, and output. The input of the self-sustaining oscillator, FEO, is food and the output is food anticipatory activity (FAA). This activity is correlated with an increase in an organism's activity leading up to feeding time. The FAA is present in constant conditions such as fasting/time-restricted feeding, and it synchronizes to food that is presented in time intervals that follow a circadian (24 hour) rhythm. Time-restricted feeding is when all of the caloric intake for a day is limited to certain times of the day. A frequent circadian timekeeping mechanism involves CLOCK/BMAL genes, cryptochrome/period genes, and a transcription/translation feedback loop (TTFL) operating in the suprachiasmatic nucleus (SCN). Clock genes are transcribed and translated into a protein product, and this protein accumulates and inhibits the promoter of the clock genes from initiating transcription. However, CLOCK mutant, cryptochrome (Cry) knockout, period (Per) knockout, and SCN knockout mice all had FAA present, so the FEO appears to not operate through the traditional circadian timekeeping mechanism.

=== Circadian genes ===
Studies have shown that Per1, Per2, and Per3 knockout mice continue to have robust FAA; these genes are not necessary for FEO oscillatory activity. Research into Bmal1 knockout mice has been more mixed, but many studies have concluded that FAA can be achieved without the Bmal1 gene. Cry1, Cry2, and NPAS2 (Clock gene paralog) knockout mice also show FAA activity, so none of these are necessary for the FEO. Still, these circadian genes have a modulatory effect on FEO activity. Mice that have their Per1/Per2/Per3 genes knocked out have FEO rhythms with shortened periods, and the same is true for Cry1 knockout mice. Cry2 knockout mice have longer periods for their FEO rhythms. Thus, the Per and Cry genes are involved but not necessary for FEO timekeeping. NPAS2 knockout mice show delayed expression of FAA, so it affects the input/output of FAA or the FEO timekeeping itself. The studies that looked at these knockout mice were conducted by Pitts et al., Iijima et al., and Pendergast et al. Yet, clock gene expression drastically increases in the dorsomedial hypothalamic nuclei (DMH) during restricted feeding, and this expression continues without feeding, indicating the circadian oscillatory activity of the FEO. Thus, it is likely that traditional clock genes are heavily involved or necessary for the FEO. This is still not resolved.

=== Neurotransmitter signaling ===
Out of the researched neurotransmitters, only disrupting the dopamine signaling pathway appears to disrupt normal FAA. It is postulated that the FEO may be in the dopaminergic circuitry. Mice without a functional Dopamine D1 receptor have attenuated FAA. Mice that are given a D1 receptor agonist show FAA without restricted feeding (a condition required for it otherwise). Thus, the dopamine pathway regulates the FAA, but it is unclear if it impacts the input, pacemaker, or output portion of the FEO pathway.

=== Hormone and neuropeptide signaling ===
Hormones involved with the regulation of food intake have been investigated for their role in the FEO timekeeping mechanism. Leptin, a hormone that suppresses food intake, is not required for FAA, but it influences the extent of FAA. Ghrelin, a hormone that increases in the plasma leading up to mealtime and activates the dopaminergic pathway, also has a modulatory effect on FAA but is not necessary for it. The signaling pathways of leptin and ghrelin lead to the hypothalamus' melanocortin system, and research into this system has also shown that it modulates, but is not necessary for, FAA.

The neuropeptides, Orexin A and B, stimulate food intake, and they have a modulatory effect on FAA but are not necessary for it. Neuropeptide Y also stimulates food intake and increases expression prior to restricted feeding, but it has not been found to affect FAA. Proteins involved in the SCN pathway (Prokineticin 2 (PK2), vasoactive intestinal peptide (VIP), pituitary adenylate cyclase-activating peptide (PACAP)) do not influence the FAA. Sirtuin 1(Sirt1) regulates physiological responses to food intake, and appears to modulate, but not be necessary for FAA. RGS16, a gene regulating G-protein coupled receptor signaling, attenuates FAA but is also not necessary for it.

== Location in mammals ==
=== Search for FEO ===
Up until the 1990s it was believed that the SCN controlled all aspects of timekeeping. However, it is well accepted that peripheral tissues including the liver and the gut also contain molecular machinery. These peripheral oscillators receive phase-resetting information from SCN but also respond to other entraining factors such as fasting/feeding being the most important. The SCN can inhibit or activate hypothalamic behavior that stimulates behavior, neuroendocrine stimulation for hormone secretion, and pre-autonomic hypothalamic neurons that affect parasympathetic and sympathetic autonomic centers in the brain stem and spinal cord (dorsal motor nucleus of the vagus), intermediolateral column of the spine). Both neuronal signaling and peripheral tissues such as the gut and liver are believed to send metabolic information to the hypothalamus via the nucleus of the solitary tract (NTS) and the parabrachial nucleus. These peripheral clocks and SCN provide information to hypothalamus about energy homeostasis. Although precise location is not identified, it appears that these oscillators are mainly entrained by feeding and fasting signals, alterations in timing, amount/composition of food, and disruption of normal clock.

=== Hypothalamic ===
Identification for possible anatomical location(s) of the FEO remains unsolved. However, recent work highlights where the FEO may not be located, leading to alternative possibilities that the FEO may not be in a distinct anatomical location. Work by Gooley et al. suggests that the dorsomedial hypothalamic nuclei (DMH) may be involved in the generation of the food anticipatory activity (FAA). Upon inducing cell-specific lesions to the DMH, the FAA in rats are diminished and is further supported by measuring EEG in these rodents. However, these reports have been challenged by Landry et al. that show that DMH-lesioned rats still portray behavior of meal anticipation even during periods of complete food deprivation.

=== Nutrient sensor ===
Nutrient sensors of the mammalian species, in particular AMP-activated protein kinase (AMPK). AMPK has been suggested as a potential source of peripheral oscillator being that it is a critical nutrient sensor that is found in every tissue of the body. In the hypothalamus, AMPK measures balance of available energy (ATP). Activated AMPK responds to increased food intake and increased expression of orexigenic neuropeptides NPY and agouti-related protein (AgRP) in the arcuate nucleus of the hypothalamus. It has been proposed that AMPK is an internal oscillator of nutrients as opposed to light in the thought that light could not penetrate all cells of mammalian tissues. AMPK also contributes to circadian phosphorylation of CRY1, reducing association of Per2. The presence or absence of glucose and fatty acids, loss of AMPK in the mouse liver has led to disrupted circadian rhythms in hepatic clock genes, pointing to the idea that AMPK has very tight connections in how nutrient regulation in peripheral tissues can have a role in specifically altering the circadian clock.

Another nutrient sensor in cAMP-response element (CRE) binding protein (CREB) also play a role and may be involved as part of FEO location. It has been suggested that the CREB in peripheral tissues such as the liver is involved in circadian phosphorylation and appetite regulation. Specifically, the phosphorylation of CREB is increased during periods of fasting and decreased during periods of feeding. In both rat and hamster models, light stimulus at night has been found to increase CREB phosphorylation and this has led to increased c-fos transcription as well as increase Per transcription in the SCN that is believed to be involved in entrainment. It is believed that feeding-induced alterations of a possible FEO site such as the CREB only take place in peripheral tissues, suggestive that this may be a mechanism in which food-induced alterations can influence desynchronization between central and peripheral clocks.

=== Gut ===
Gut signaling in mammals may be key in understanding the entrainment of feeding/fasting in both rodents and humans-particularly the gut microbiome, bile acids, incretins, nutrients, and metabolites. An example of this is the liver's response when food is accessible with noted ~5000 active liver transcripts upregulated in anticipation of food in rodents compared to ~350 transcripts during food restriction. These anticipatory food mechanisms point to an interconnectedness of peripheral oscillators such as the liver and gut microbiota. It has been shown that animals and humans that experience "shift work" outside of their normal fasting/feeding cycles demonstrate disruption in feeding cycles as noted by alterations of circadian genes. Supporting this, human observational work has noted lower energy expenditure at night and single nucleotide polymorphisms (SNPs) in the CLOCK gene with noted susceptibility to increased risk of metabolic syndrome. With this in mind, the gut is such a peripheral target for the FEO due to its connection to the brain and ingested foods. Candidate targets in the gut for entrainment could be the gut lumen that shares such intimate contact with foods, distinctly the enteroendocrine cells (EECs). The identification of EECs as a possible source of FEO is that they contain many nutrient sensing and dependent receptors that can trigger section of gut peptides including incretins, peptide YY, cholecystokinin, gastrin, serotonin, and secretin.

== Non-mammals ==
=== In pigeons ===
In pigeons, there is evidence of a FEO that functions separately from photic-entrainable oscillators. The experimental design to confirm the presence of FEO in rats was to lesion their SCNs, but because it is impossible to lesion the SCNs of pigeons, to prove FEO presence the pigeons were kept in 12 hr light and 12 hr dark light cycle and fed at a fixed time every day. In anticipation of feeding, the core body temperature of the pigeons rose. When the pigeons were not given their daily meal, their normal anticipatory behavior persisted. It was only with ad lib feeding that caused the birds to free run, which confirms the presence of a separate, food-entrainable oscillator.

=== In goldfish ===
An experimental study designed to determine if food entrainable oscillator activity occurs in goldfish Carassius auratus found that goldfish demonstrated FAA and that scheduled feedings were able to entrain locomotor activity rhythms in goldfish. When given a single meal once a day in the middle of the day, the fish developed anticipation of the food, and this anticipation continued even once the fish were moved from LD conditions to constant conditions of DD. Additionally, when the feeding cycle was shifted by 9 hrs in DD, the fish were able to resynchronize their activity rhythms to feeding times. The continuation of the fish's synchronization and adaptation to new feeding times in DD proves that feeding, not light was causing the rhythms in anticipatory activity.

However, more research is needed to definitively prove the presence of an FEO in fish. It is evident that in DD the food is acting as the only thing that can entrain the fish, but it is possible that in LD an FEO and light-entrainable oscillator (LEO) work together and are coupled to cause anticipatory rhythms. It is also possible that another mechanism allows fish to anticipate food times, so the study concludes that fish either have separate but coupled FEO and LEO's or a single oscillator that entrains to both food and light.

In 2008, further research was done to examine the presence of an FEO in Carassius auratus. When goldfish were first exposed to a 12:12 LD cycle and fed at 12:00. When moved to constant light, the fish exhibited food-anticipatory activity and had a free-running period of about 24 hours. Because the goldfish were able to remember feeding times when their light cycle was disrupted, this study suggests that the goldfish are able to remember daily feeding times and thus have a food entrainable oscillator, though its location remains unknown.
