= Carrie L. Partch =

American biochemist

- Born: Carrie L. Stentz; 30 November 1973 (age 52); Kirkland, Washington, USA
- Education: University of Washington; University of North Carolina at Chapel Hill
- Scientific career
- Fields: Chronobiology, Biochemistry, Biophysics, Structural Biology
- Workplaces: Oregon Health Sciences University University of Texas Southwestern University of California, Santa Cruz
- Thesis: Signal transduction mechanisms of cryptochrome (2006)
- Doctoral advisor: Aziz Sancar
- Website: https://www.partchlab.com/

Carrie L. Partch (born 30 November 1973) is an American protein biochemist and circadian biologist. Partch is currently a Professor in the Department of Chemistry and Biochemistry at the University of California, Santa Cruz. She is noted for her work using biochemical and biophysical techniques to study the mechanisms of circadian rhythmicity across multiple organisms. Partch applies principles of chemistry and physics to further her research in the field of biological clocks.

== Academic career ==
In her undergraduate career at the University of Washington, Partch earned her Bachelor of Science in Biochemistry with a minor in Italian. After three years as a Research Technician at Oregon Health Sciences University under Dr. Daniel Carr, she went on to join the lab of Nobel Laureate Aziz Sancar at the University of North Carolina at Chapel Hill. While at UNC Chapel Hill, Partch earned her PhD in Biochemistry and Biophysics. Partch's PhD research focused on signal transduction mechanisms by cryptochrome proteins.

In her post-doctoral research, Partch focused on the interaction of the aryl hydrocarbon receptor nuclear translocator with its heterodimeric binding partner, the transcription factor HIF-2α, under Kevin Gardner at University of Texas Southwestern Medical Center. She subsequently moved this expertise into the circadian field to work with Joseph Takahashi, also at University of Texas Southwestern Medical Center, where she studied the related Basic Helix-Loop-Helix-PAS transcription factor that drives circadian rhythmicity, CLOCK:BMAL1.

Partch began her career in teaching as an assistant professor (2011-2017) at UC Santa Cruz in the Department of Chemistry and Biochemistry. Partch went on to become an associate professor (2017-2019), and is now a professor (2019–present) in UC Santa Cruz's Chemistry and Biochemistry Department.

== Early research ==
=== Early research at Oregon Health Sciences University ===
Partch's early research at Oregon Health Sciences University has a broad biochemical scope, her first publication focusing on the regulation of IL-15-stimulated TNF-alpha production, a study applicable to patients with rheumatoid arthritis. Similarly, Partch's second publication on sperm-specific proteins which interact with A-kinase anchoring proteins showcases fascinating biochemical research not yet involving chronobiology.

=== PhD Thesis Research at UNC Chapel Hill ===
Following Partch's earliest research at OHSU, she began to home in on cryptochrome proteins and their signal transduction mechanisms, the focus of her PhD thesis. In her thesis, Partch discusses convergence in plant and animal cryptochromes, translational repressors in biological clock feedback loops, and most notably, incorporates extensive research of biological clocks into her dissertation. Partch studied mammalian cryptochromes' interactions with protein phosphatase 5 to investigate how inhibition of PP5 affects the activity of casein kinase I epsilon, the major clock kinase. Partch delves further into her passion for chronobiology in her thesis.

== Current research ==
Partch's Lab currently focuses on the proteins known to circadian timekeeping, and utilizes a range of structural and biophysical techniques in order to characterize the biological role of these proteins including NMR spectroscopy and X-ray crystallography. Current projects include both mammalian and cyanobacterial timekeeping mechanisms. Notably, the lab recently published work in the journal Science, elucidating the role of the protein SasA in the cooperative binding of KaiB to the KaiC hexamer in the cyanobacterial circadian clock. In 2020, the lab published a paper describing how the mammalian circadian protein PERIOD and its cognate kinase Casein Kinase 1 form a molecular switch to regulate PERIOD protein stability, and therefore circadian periodicity.

=== Role of SasA protein in cyanobacteria ===
Previously, many models of cyanobacterial time keeping were based solely on the continuous phosphorylation of the Kai proteins (KaiA, KaiB, and KaiC) with SasA and CikA providing only input-output signaling. These earlier dependent models relied solely on KaiC acting as the main component of the circadian oscillator with KaiA being used to phosphorylase Threonine and Serine and KaiB being used for their subsequent dephosphorylation. For these reactions to work, ATP is broken down to ADP to provide the necessary energy and phosphate groups necessary to power these reactions. Partch challenged this assumption by modeling the effect of SasA proteins in differing concentrations of KaiA, KaiB, and KaiC. It was found that SasA uses structural mimicry to help fold-switched KaiB bind to the KaiC hexamer so that the nighttime repressive complex can be formed. This maintains the rhythmicity of the circadian oscillator during limiting concentrations of KaiB by allowing both of the hexamers to auto phosphorylate and dephosphorylate threonine and serine. Conversely, SasA proteins compete with KaiB proteins for the binding of the KaiC hexamer when the concentration of SasA exceeds that of KaiB. The competition between these proteins can be mitigated when the concentration of SasA is less than or equal to half of the concentration of KaiB. Lower concentrations of SasA allow for KaiB to bind to the KaiC hexamer solely; it does not need to compete for KaiC binding spots with SasA.

=== PERIOD proteins and CK1 ===
Carrie Partch has made significant discoveries pertaining to PERIOD protein's role in regulating the circadian clock. PERIOD proteins, Per1and Per2, create large, multimeric complexes with the circadian repressors CRY1 and CRY2. These complexes directly bind to and inhibit the core circadian transcription factor, CLOCK:BMAL1. As PERIOD proteins are central components of our biological clock, the regulation of PER1 and PER2's expression, modification, and protein stability is especially important. Additionally, casein Kinase 1 (CK1) phosphorylates both the Degron region (initiates PER degradation) and the FASP region (antagonistically stabilizes PER). Partch discovered and characterized the activity of CK1 on its biological substrate in vivo. Particularly, her findings demonstrated that the CK1 tau mutation, which reduces the oscillation cycle to roughly 20 hours, amplifies the Degron activity of CK1 while diminishing the FASP activity. Additionally, she identified the molecular switch involving an anion binding site in CK1 that regulates the phosphorylation of functionally antagonistic sites in PERIOD proteins. Her research showed that mutations in period-altering kinases differentially regulate the activation loop switch to produce expected variations in PER2 stability, laying the groundwork for comprehending and controlling CK1's impact on circadian rhythms.

=== Phosphoswitch Model ===
Previous research has been completed to identify key components of Familial Advanced Sleep Phase Syndrome (FASPS) also known as Advanced sleep phase disorder. However, Partch contributed to the development of the formalized phosphoswitch model, compiling the previous research into a single model. The phosphoswitch model is a proposed regulatory mechanism for the stabilization and destabilization of the PERIOD protein in the mammalian circadian clock. This model explains the circadian sensitivity and phenotypic differences caused by mutations within the PER2 protein at site 662 and site 478. A downstream mutation from a serine to a glycine at site 662 leads to a shorter period, underphosphorylation, and PER2 destabilization. Because of the resulting shorter period, the phosphoswitch model is a possible mechanism for Familial Advanced Sleep Phase Syndrome (FASPS). The exact role of phosphorylation within the FASP region in the stabilization of PER2 is not yet known.

== Awards ==
- 2018 - "Aschoff's Rule", Gordon Conference on Chronobiology
- 2018 - Margaret Oakley Dayhoff Award, Biophysical Society
- 2022 - NAS Award in Molecular Biology
