= Bacterial circadian rhythm =

Bacterial circadian rhythms, like other circadian rhythms, are endogenous "biological clocks" that have the following three characteristics:

- (a) in constant conditions (i.e. constant temperature and either constant light {LL} or constant darkness {DD}) they oscillate with a period that is close to, but not exactly, 24 hours in duration,
- (b) this "free-running" rhythm is temperature compensated, and
- (c) the rhythm will entrain to an appropriate environmental cycle.

Until the mid-1980s, it was thought that only eukaryotic cells had circadian rhythms. It is now known that cyanobacteria (a phylum of photosynthetic eubacteria) have well-documented circadian rhythms that meet all the criteria of bona fide circadian rhythms. In these bacteria, three key proteins whose structures have been determined, KaiA, KaiB, and KaiC can form a molecular clockwork that orchestrates global gene expression. This system enhances the fitness of cyanobacteria in rhythmic environments.

== History: are prokaryotes capable of circadian rhythmicity? ==
Before the mid-1980s, it was believed that only eukaryotes had circadian systems.

Time-lapse video of circadian luminescence rhythms from cyanobacterial colonies on a petri dish. Each spot is a single cyanobacterial colony.

In 1985–6, several research groups discovered that cyanobacteria display daily rhythms of nitrogen fixation in both light/dark (LD) cycles and in constant light. The group of Huang and co-workers was the first to recognize clearly that the cyanobacterium Synechococcus sp. RF-1 was exhibiting circadian rhythms, and in a series of publications beginning in 1986 demonstrated all three of the salient characteristics of circadian rhythms described above in the same organism, the unicellular freshwater Synechococcus sp. RF-1. Another ground-breaking study was that of Sweeney and Borgese.

Inspired by the research of the aforementioned pioneers, the collaborative group of Takao Kondo, Carl H. Johnson, Susan Golden, and Masahiro Ishiura genetically transformed the cyanobacterium Synechococcus elongatus with a luciferase reporter that allowed rhythmic gene expression to be assayed non-invasively as rhythmically "glowing" cells. This system allowed an exquisitely precise circadian rhythm of luminescence to be measured from cell populations and even from single cyanobacterial cells. The figure shows the daily oscillations in luminescence of many individual cyanobacterial colonies on a petri dish; note the synchrony of rhythmicity among the various colonies.

== Relationship to cell division ==
Despite predictions that circadian clocks would not be expressed by cells that are doubling faster than once per 24 hours, the cyanobacterial rhythms continue in cultures that are growing with doubling times as rapid as one division every 5–6 hours.

== Adaptive significance ==
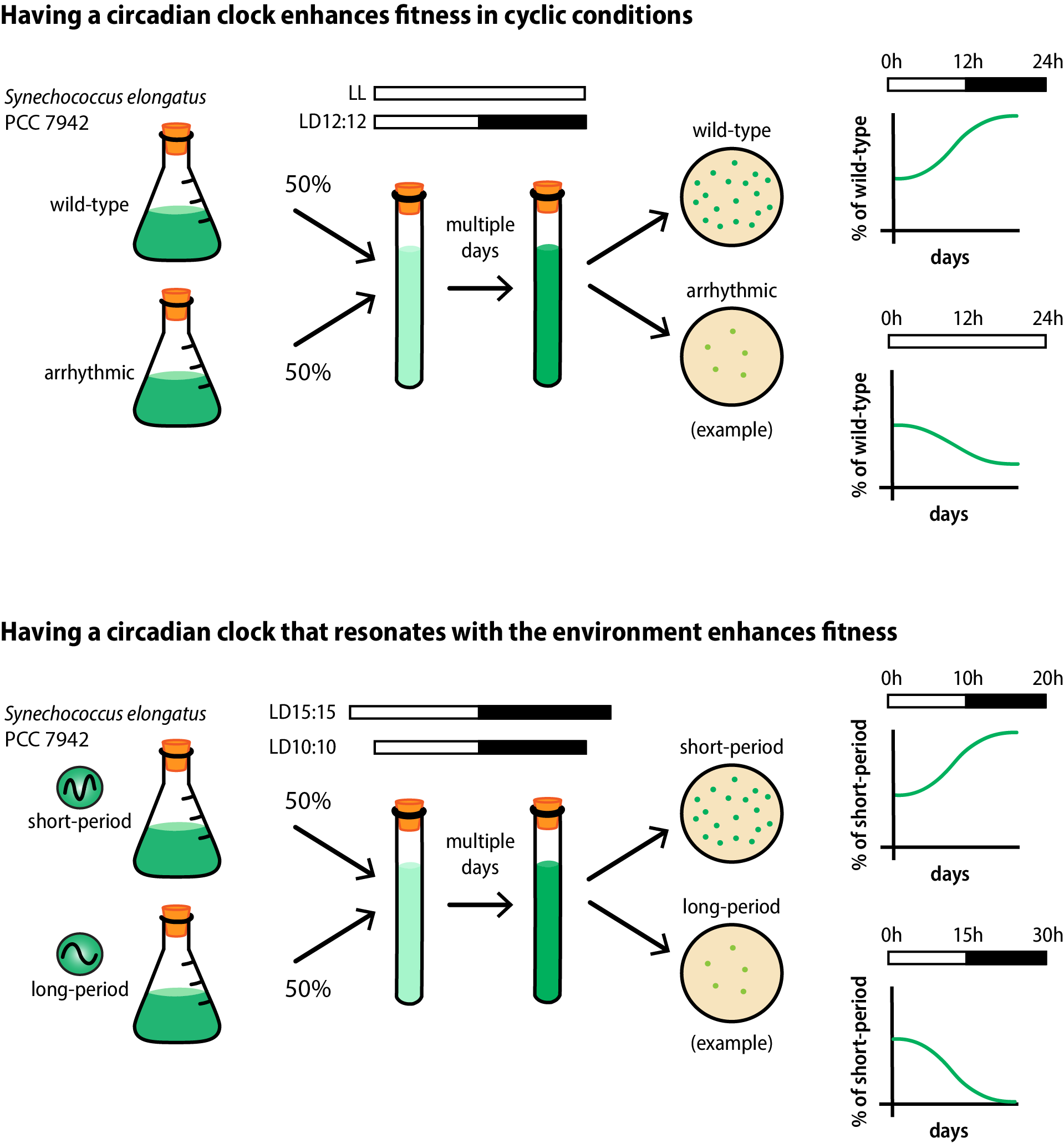
Adaptive advantage of cyanobacterial circadian clock

Do circadian timekeepers enhance the fitness of organisms growing under natural conditions? Circadian clocks are assumed to enhance the fitness of organisms by improving their ability to predict and anticipate daily cycles in environmental factors. However, there have been few rigorous tests of this proposition in any organism. Cyanobacteria are one of the few organisms in which such a test has been performed. The adaptive fitness test was done by mixing cyanobacterial strains that express different circadian properties (i.e., rhythmicity vs. arhythmicity, different periods, etc.) and growing them in competition under different environmental conditions. The idea was to determine if having an appropriately functional clock system enhances fitness under competitive conditions. The result was that strains with a functioning biological clock out-compete arhythmic strains in environments that have a rhythmic light/dark cycle (e.g., 12 hours of light alternating with 12 hours of darkness), whereas in "constant" environments (e.g., constant illumination) rhythmic and arhythmic strains grow at comparable rates. Among rhythmic strains with different periods, the strains whose endogenous period most closely matches the period of the environmental cycle is able to out-compete strains whose period does not match that of the environment. Similar results were later obtained in plants and mice.

== Global regulation of gene expression and chromosomal topology ==
In eukaryotes, about 10–20% of the genes are rhythmically expressed (as gauged by rhythms of mRNA abundance). However, in cyanobacteria, a much larger percentage of genes are controlled by the circadian clock. For example, one study has shown that the activity of essentially all promoters in the genome are rhythmically regulated. The mechanism by which this global gene regulation is mechanistically linked to the circadian clock appears to be due to clock triggering of a transcriptional cascade coupled to rhythmic changes in the topology of the entire cyanobacterial chromosome.

== Molecular mechanism of the cyanobacterial clockwork ==
Time-lapse video of cyanobacterial clock mutants with different periods. The circadian rhythm of luminescence from four different strains in constant light are shown: Wild-type (top) with a period of about 25 h, a long-period mutant (second from top) with a period of about 50 h, a short-period mutant (third from top) with a period of about 17 h, and an arhythmic mutant (bottom).

The S. elongatus luciferase reporter system was used to screen for clock gene mutants, of which many were isolated. The figure shows a few of the many mutants that were discovered. These mutants were used to identify the core KaiA, KaiB, KaiC clock genes.

At first, the cyanobacterial clockwork appeared to be a transcription and translation feedback loop in which clock proteins autoregulate the activity of their own promoters by a process that was similar in concept to the circadian clock loops of eukaryotes. Subsequently, however, several lines of evidence indicated that transcription and translation was not necessary for circadian rhythms of Kai proteins, the most spectacular being that the three purified Kai proteins can reconstitute a temperature-compensated circadian oscillation in a test tube.

In vivo, the output of this biochemical KaiABC oscillator to rhythms of gene expression appears to be mediated by KaiC phosphorylation status (see below) regulating a biochemical cascade involving a histidine kinase SasA and a phosphatase CikA that activate/inactivate the globally acting transcription factor RpaA. A contributing factor to the global transcription programs is rhythms of chromosomal topology in which the circadian clock orchestrates dramatic circadian changes in DNA topology that modulates changes in the transcription rates.

== Visualizing the clockwork's "gears": structural biology of clock proteins ==
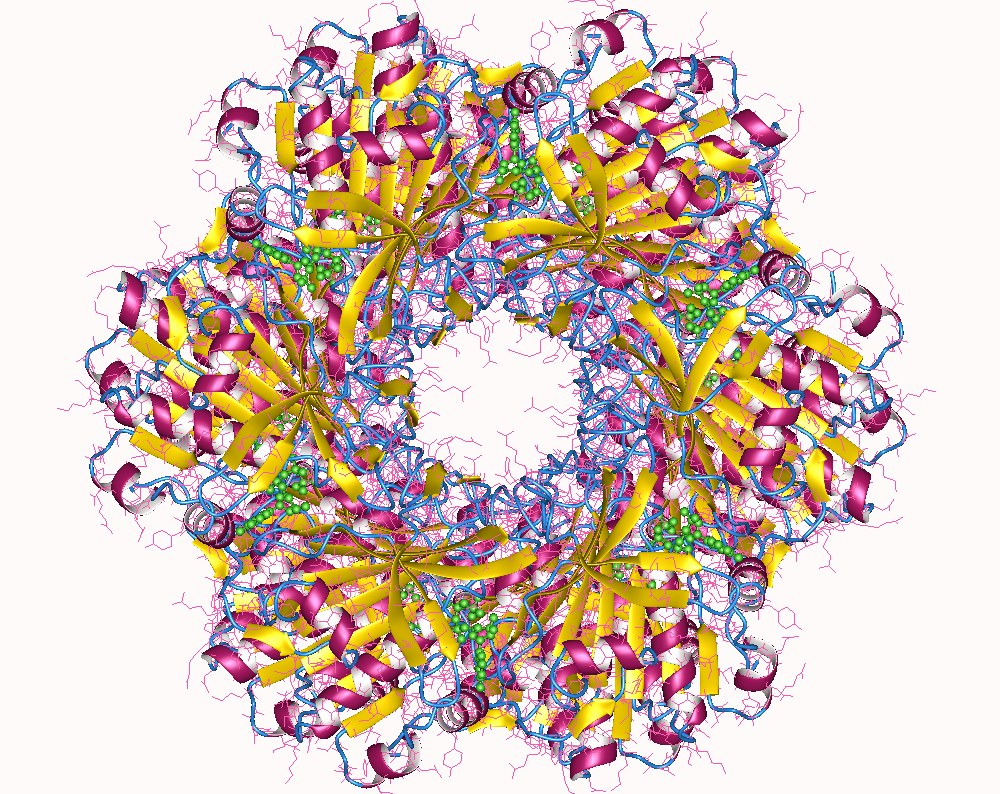
Clock Protein KaiC hexamer, Synechococcus elongatus

The cyanobacterial circadian system is so far unique in that it is the only circadian system in which the structures of full-length clock proteins have been solved. In fact, the structures of all three of the Kai proteins have been determined. KaiC forms a hexamer that resembles a double doughnut with a central pore that is partially sealed at one end. There are twelve ATP-binding sites in KaiC and the residues that are phosphorylated during the in vitro phosphorylation rhythm have been identified. KaiA has two major domains and forms dimers in which the N-terminal domains are "swapped" with the C-terminal domains. KaiB has been successfully crystallized from three different species of cyanobacteria and forms dimers or tetramers.

The three-dimensional structures have been helpful in elucidating the cyanobacterial clock mechanism by providing concrete models for the ways in which the three Kai proteins interact and influence each other.

KaiC Phosphorylation Cycle of the Cyanobacterial Clock

The structural approaches have also allowed the KaiA/KaiB/KaiC complexes to be visualized as a function of time, which enabled sophisticated mathematical modeling of the in vitro phosphorylation rhythm. Therefore, the cyanobacterial clock components and their interactions can be visualized in four dimensions (three in space, one in time). The temporal formation patterns of the KaiA/KaiB/KaiC complex have been elucidated, along with an interpretation of the core mechanism based on the cycle of KaiC phosphorylation patterns and the dynamics of the KaiA/KaiB/KaiC complex. (See the animation of the phsophorylation/complex cycle.) In addition, single-molecule methods (high-speed atomic force microscopy) have been applied to visualize in real time and quantify the dynamic interactions of KaiA with KaiC on sub-second timescales. These interactions regulate the circadian oscillation by modulating the magnesium binding in KaiC.

While the KaiABC phosphorylation/complex cycle can explain key features of this biochemical circadian oscillator, especially how it can link to the output pathways that regulate global gene expression patterns, it does not provide an explanation for why the oscillator has a period of approximately 24 hours, nor how it can be "temperature compensated." Phosphorylation/dephosphorylation reactions and protein complex associations/dissassociations can be very rapid, so why does this biochemical oscillator have a period that is as slow as 24 hours and yet still be so precise? One model is that the rate-limiting reaction that determines the period is the very slow rate of ATP hydrolysis by KaiC. KaiC hydrolyses ATP at the remarkably slow rate of only 15 ATP molecules per KaiC monomer per 24 hours. The rate of this ATPase activity is temperature compensated, and the activities of wild-type and period-mutant KaiC proteins are directly proportional to their in vivo circadian frequencies, suggesting that the ATPase activity defines the circadian period. Therefore, some authors have proposed that the KaiC ATPase activity constitutes the most fundamental reaction underlying circadian periodicity in cyanobacteria. Structural analyses of the KaiC ATPase suggested that the slowness of this ATP hydrolysis arises from sequestration of a lytic water molecule in an unfavorable position and coupling of ATP hydrolysis to a peptide isomerization, thereby increasing the activation energy of ATP hydrolysis and slowing it to a 24 hour timescale.

== Circadian advantage ==
In the context of bacterial circadian rhythms, specifically in cyanobacteria, circadian advantage refers to the improved competitive advantage of strains of cyanobacteria that "resonate" with the environmental circadian rhythm. For example, consider a strain with a free-running period (FRP) of 24 hours that is co-cultured with a strain that has a free-running period (FRP) of 30 hours in a light-dark cycle of 12 hours light and 12 hours dark (LD 12:12). The strain that has a 24-hour FRP will out-compete the 30-hour strain over time under these LD 12:12 conditions. On the other hand, in a light-dark cycle of 15 hours light and 15 hours darkness, the 30-hour strain will out-compete the 24-hour strain. Moreover, rhythmic strains of cyanobacteria will out-compete arhythmic strains in 24-h light/dark cycles, but in continuous light, arhythmic strains are able to co-exist with wild-type cells in mixed cultures.

== Other bacteria ==
The only prokaryotic group with a well-documented circadian timekeeping mechanism is the cyanobacteria. Recent studies have suggested that there might be 24-hour timekeeping mechanisms among other prokaryotes. The purple non-sulfur bacterium Rhodopseudomonas palustris is one such example, as it harbors homologs of KaiB and KaiC and exhibits adaptive KaiC-dependent growth enhancement in 24-hour cyclic environments. However, R. palustris was reported to show a poor intrinsic free-running rhythm of nitrogen fixation under constant conditions. The lack of rhythm in R. palustris in constant conditions has implications for the adaptive value of intrinsic timekeeping mechanism. Therefore, the R. palustris system was proposed as a "proto" circadian timekeeper that exhibit some parts of circadian systems (kaiB and kaiC homologs), but not all.

There is some evidence of a circadian clock in Bacillus subtilis. Luciferase promoter assays showed gene expression patterns of ytvA, a gene encoding a blue light photoreceptor, that satisfied the criteria of a circadian clock. However, there has yet to be a robust demonstration of a clock in B. subtilis and the potential mechanisms of circadian gene regulation within B. subtilis remain unknown.

Another interesting example is the case of the microbiome. It is possible that circadian clocks play a role in the gut microbiota behavior. These microorganisms experience daily changes because their hosts eat on a daily routine (consumption in the day for diurnal animals and in the night for nocturnal hosts). The presence of a daily timekeeper might allow gut bacteria to anticipate resources coming from the host temporally, thereby giving those species of bacteria a competitive advantage over other species in the gut. Some bacteria are known to take hints from the host circadian clock in the form of melatonin. The disrupted gut microbiome has been proven to be related to a lot of diseases in humans gut microbiota. Thus, it is critical to our health to maintain a healthy gut microbiota. The host's circadian clock circadian rhythm controls the gut environment's ~24h cycle of many factors such as temperature changes, nutrients, certain hormones, bile acid levels, immune system functions. The relative abundances of some gut bacteria, such as Firmicutes and Bacteroidetes, display a clear daily cycle. In arrhythmic mice with clock-component dysfunctions, this rhythmicity disappears. Jet-lag and sleep deprivation can lead to the disruptions of the microbiome daily oscillations, but the changes are usually not dramatic.

This interaction is bidirectional as the gut microbiota can also act on the hosts. For example, antibiotics can affect the rhythmic adherence of gut bacteria to the intestinal epithelium and in turn, rewire the hosts' chromatin and transcription oscillations in the intestines and in the livers.

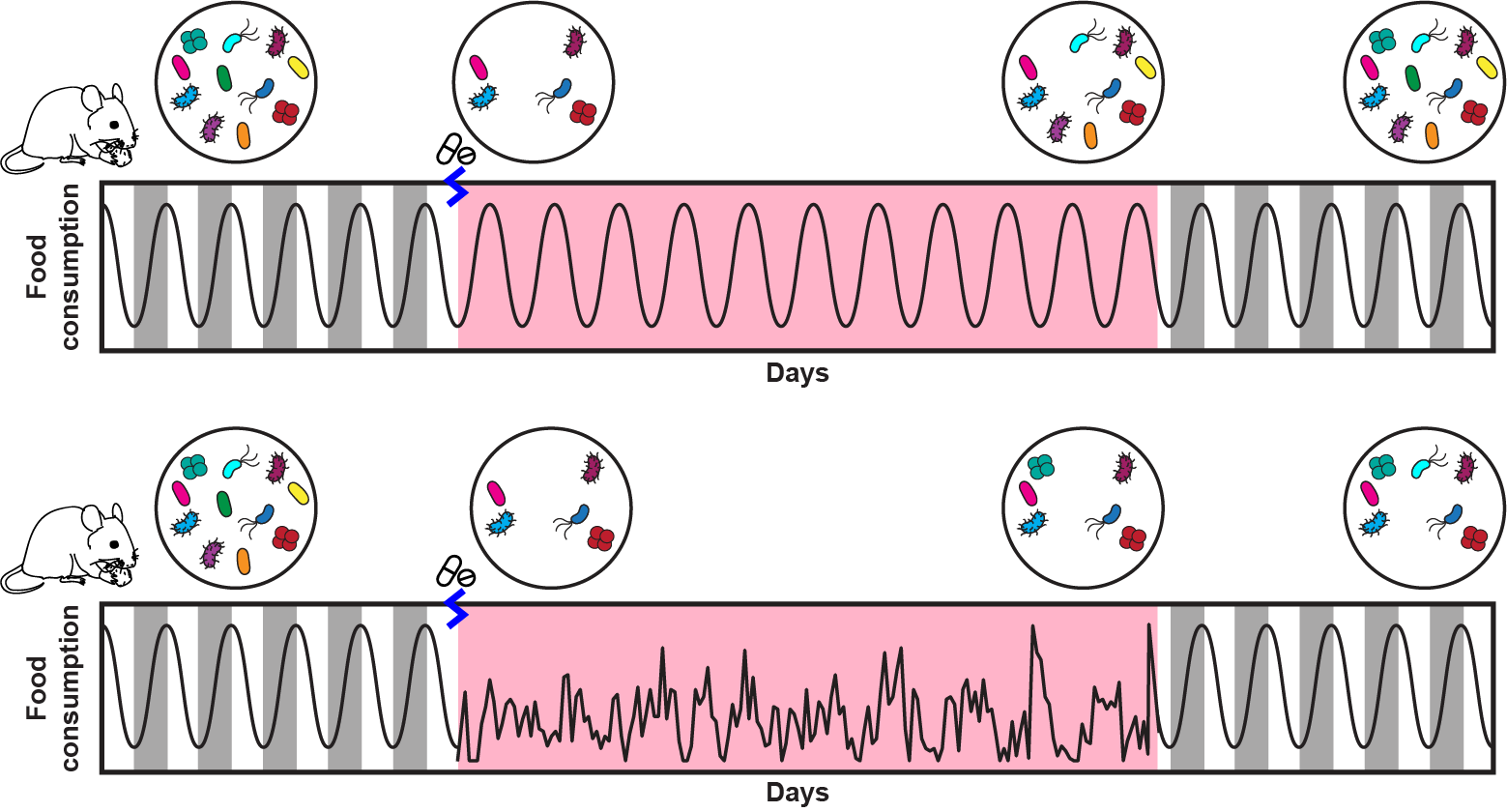
Antibiotic treatment interferes with circadian rhythms in gut microbiome in clock gene mutated mice

Some of the current research in this field is focused on whether or not gut bacteria have intrinsic circadian rhythms. If so, researchers speculate that they may use their host's feeding patterns as zeitgebers. A long-term study on mice was conducted to determine whether the hosts' rhythmic and arrhythmic feeding behaviors contributed differently to the recoveries of their gut microbiota from antibiotic treatment. Researchers found that rhythmic behavior after antibiotic ablation facilitates complete recovery of the gut microbiota. On the other hand, arrhythmic behavior after antibiotic ablation hinders the gut microbiota's proper recovery. Instead, this behavior promotes microbiota recovery to a new steady status that is distinct from the original. The genus Turicibacter, proven to modulate the mood-related neurotransmitter serotonin, was found to overly recover. This effect may lower the serotonin level in the gut, connecting the gut microbiome to effects on the host's mental health.

There are 4,616 bacterial species recognized in the human gut. Only 2 of them, Klebsiella aerogenes and Bacillus subtilis, are currently reported to have circadian clocks. It is suspected that other gut bacteria may have circadian clocks, too.

== See also ==
- Circadian rhythm
- Chronobiology
- Cyanobacteria
- KaiA
- KaiB
- KaiC
- Oscillating gene
- Phosphorylation
- Synechococcus
