= Susan Golden =

American biologist

- Born: 1957 (age 68–69); Pine Bluff, Arkansas, United States
- Education: BA in Biology from Mississippi University for Women (1978), PhD in Genetics from the University of Missouri (1983)
- Spouse: James Golden (m. 1979)
- Scientific career
- Fields: Chronobiology, Bioengineering
- Workplaces: University of Chicago (1983), Texas A&M University (1986), UC San Diego Division of Biological Sciences (2008)
- Doctoral advisor: Louis A. Sherman

Susan Golden (née Stephens; born 1957) is an American professor of molecular biology known for her research in circadian rhythms. She is a faculty member at UC San Diego (2008-present).

== Early life and education ==
Golden was born in Pine Bluff, Arkansas in 1957. She attended the local public high school, where she was involved with the marching band and school newspaper. She was accepted to the Mississippi University for Women in 1976 as a journalism major, but soon switched her studies to major in biology and minor in chemistry.

Golden graduated from MUW in two years, after which she was offered a position in the first cohort of trainees in a NIH-financed doctoral program in genetics at the University of Missouri. During her graduate program, Golden met James Golden, a fellow doctoral student. They later married in 1979. At the University of Missouri, Golden researched the protein makeup of the photosynthetic center in cyanobacteria, work she continued when she moved to the University of Chicago in 1983 as a postdoctoral research fellow.

In 1986, Golden accepted a faculty position at Texas A&M to further her investigation into light-dependent gene regulation in bacteria. While at Texas A&M, Golden became interested in studying circadian rhythms after her first encounter with Carl Johnson and Takao Kondo, with whom she would go on to discover the Kai complex. Golden was promoted to Distinguished Professor at Texas A&M in 2003, and then moved to UC San Diego in 2008 where she is a Distinguished Professor and the Director of the Center for Circadian Biology.

== Research contributions ==
=== Early work ===
Golden began her graduate career with Louis A. Sherman, using genetic tools to research the proteins in photosynthetic complexes of the cyanobacteria Synechoccus elongatus. Golden was the first to demonstrate that a mutant allele of the psbA gene is sufficient to confer herbicide resistance in cyanobacteria. Further research confirmed that this gene encoded a protein integral to the Photosystem II complex involved in photosynthesis. These findings demonstrated that genetic manipulation of cyanobacteria was relatively simple, opening up S. elongatus as a model organism for future genetic experiments. During her postdoctoral research at the University of Chicago, in the lab of Robert Haselkorn, Golden continued to work on developing genetic manipulation techniques for Synechoccus elongatus in order to elucidate mechanisms of gene regulation in photosynthesis genes. In 1989, Golden's team discovered that the specific psbA allele expressed by cyanobacteria depended on the lighting conditions in which the colony was grown. This finding led her to investigate more generally how light influences expression of photosynthetic genes in the organism and contributed to understanding bacterial responses to environmental input. This line of inquiry necessitated the development of a technique for visualizing changes in gene expression in living organisms. During her time as a professor at the Texas A&M, Golden attempted to solve this problem by attaching a luciferase gene to the promoters of the cyanobacterial genes of interest and viewing the colonies with a night vision scope. The approach was a success, allowing for quantification of cyanobacterial gene expression in vivo over an extended time period. This technique drew the interest of chronobiologist Carl H. Johnson, with whom Golden would collaborate and eventually discover the KaiABC complex .

=== Discovery of kai complex ===
Golden studies the endogenous rhythms of cyanobacteria, a group of photosynthetic bacteria known to have circadian clocks. She transformed Synechococcus elongatus, one of the better studied cyanobacteria species, with a luciferase reporter gene and showed circadian rhythm in bioluminescence. This reporter system was used to discover three key proteins related to the cyanobacterial clock: KaiA, KaiB, and KaiC. In collaboration with Carl H. Johnson and Takao Kondo, she demonstrated and described the molecular mechanism regulating circadian rhythms in S. elongatus PCC 7942, the only model organism for a prokaryotic circadian clock. Golden identified genes in the S. elongatus genome that contribute to circadian rhythm through selection in mutational screens using transposons to disrupt genes and their function. In one mutation screen study, nineteen mutations were identified and mapped to the three kai genes. Inactivation of any single kai gene reduced kaiBC-promoter activity and abolished the circadian rhythm of expression of KaiA and KaiB.

=== The kai protein circadian system ===
S. elongatus has a circadian clock with an oscillator based only on three proteins: KaiA, KaiB, and KaiC. Circadium rhythm is generated based on KaiC phosphorylation and dephosphorylation. Light transmits energy and information to the cyanobacteria, affecting transcriptional regulation of the circadium clock. This 24-hour rhythm can be recreated in vitro with the addition of ATP. The ratio of ATP/ADP fluctuates during the course of the day, and is sensed by KaiC, which phosphorylates or de-phosphorylates based on this signal. This Kai protein system is the simplest post-translational oscillator known so far.

In photosynthesizing cyanobacteria, the circadian clock is driven by light and reset by darkness. When Golden mutated the gene cikA, the clock was functional but could not be reset, resulting in the bacterial equivalent of permanent jet lag. CikA protein contains a domain that is structurally similar to KaiA, which was also found to be important in resetting the clock. CikA and KaiA bind to quinones, which carry electrons in the electron transport chain of photosynthesis. Quinones are oxidized in the dark and reduced in the light, and the redox state affects KaiA activity. When quinones are oxidized, KaiA separates from KaiC and binds to them, resetting the clock. Therefore, quinones are essential in transmitting light information to KaiC.

In 2026, Golden and colleagues constructed a minimalist circadian clock using only six proteins to regulate circadian gene expression. This system may be constructed and operational in other bacterial systems.

=== Current research ===
==== Metabolic engineering ====
After moving to UC San Diego in 2008, Susan Golden's research converged with that of her husband, James Golden, to investigate biofuels. She currently researches the potential of utilizing cyanobacteria for industrial production of biofuels. Cyanobacteria are attractive due to simplistic genomes and ability to be genetically modified for industrial efficiency. Their photosynthetic nature may ideally be used to produce sustainably produce biofuels, potentially replacing the need for petroleum and other fossil fuels. They have simple requirements for growth, only requiring sunlight, water, and inorganic trace elements for fast growth. Cyanobacteria are capable of fixing atmospheric carbon (carbon dioxide) into bio-oils and biofuels.

In 2016, Golden and colleagues manually curated a model of metabolism in S. elongatus, indicating the importance of a linear tricarboxylic acid cycle (TCA) metabolic pathway and potential modifications for bio-industrial application.

== Honors, awards, and membership ==
- National Science Foundation Presidential Young Investigator Award, 1989 - 1995
- Fellow of the American Academy of Microbiology, elected in 2000
- Texas A&M Distinguished Professor, 2003
- Member of the Faculty of 1000 Biology, 2008 - 2015
- UC San Diego Distinguished Professor and Chancellor’s Associates Chair in Molecular Biology, 2008–present
- Member of the National Academy of Sciences, elected in 2010
- Howard Hughes Medical Institute Professor, 2014–2024
- Aschoff and Honma Prize for Biological Rhythm Research, 2018
- Elected to the American Academy of Microbiology Board of Governors, 2019

== Selected publications ==
- Kondo T, Strayer CA, Kulkarni RD, Taylor W, Ishiura M, Golden SS, Johnson CH (1993). "Circadian rhythms in prokaryotes: luciferase as a reporter of circadian gene expression in cyanobacteria". Proc Natl Acad Sci USA. 90 (12): 5672–6. Bibcode:1993PNAS...90.5672K. doi:10.1073/pnas.90.12.5672. PMC 46783. PMID 8516317.
- Kondo T, Tsinoremas NF, Golden SS, Johnson CH, Kutsuna S, Ishiura M (1994). "Circadian clock mutants of cyanobacteria". Science. 266 (5188): 1233–6. Bibcode:1994Sci...266.1233K. doi:10.1126/science.7973706. PMID 7973706.
- Liu Y, Golden SS, Kondo T, Ishiura M, Johnson CH (1995). "Bacterial luciferase as a reporter of circadian gene expression in cyanobacteria". J Bacteriol. 177 (8): 2080–6. doi:10.1128/jb.177.8.2080-2086.1995. PMC 176852. PMID 7536731.
- Golden SS (1995). "Light-responsive gene expression in cyanobacteria". J Bacteriol. 177 (7): 1651–4. doi:10.1128/jb.177.7.1651-1654.1995. PMC 176789. PMID 7896684.
- Liu Y, Tsinoremas NF, Johnson CH, Lebedeva NV, Golden SS, Ishiura M, Kondo T (1995). "Circadian orchestration of gene expression in cyanobacteria". Genes Dev. 9 (12): 1469–78. doi:10.1101/gad.9.12.1469. PMID 7601351.
- Tsinoremas NF, Ishiura M, Kondo T, Andersson CR, Tanaka K, Takahashi H, Johnson CH, Golden SS (1996). "A sigma factor that modifies the circadian expression of a subset of genes in cyanobacteria". EMBO J. 15 (10): 2488–95. doi:10.1002/j.1460-2075.1996.tb00606.x. PMC 450181. PMID 8665856.
- Johnson CH, Golden SS, Ishiura M, Kondo T (1996). "Circadian clocks in prokaryotes". Mol Microbiol. 21 (1): 5–11. doi:10.1046/j.1365-2958.1996.00613.x. PMID 8843429. S2CID 40431382.
- Kondo T, Mori T, Lebedeva NV, Aoki S, Ishiura M, Golden SS (1997). "Circadian rhythms in rapidly dividing cyanobacteria". Science. 275 (5297): 224–7. doi:10.1126/science.275.5297.224. PMID 8985018. S2CID 31261881.
- Golden SS, Ishiura M, Johnson CH, Kondo T (1997). "Cyanobacterial circadian rhythms". Annu Rev Plant Physiol Plant Mol Biol. 48: 327–354. doi:10.1146/annurev.arplant.48.1.327. PMID 15012266.
- Ouyang Y, Andersson CR, Kondo T, Golden SS, Johnson CH (1998). "Resonating circadian clocks enhance fitness in cyanobacteria". Proc Natl Acad Sci USA. 95 (15): 8660–4. Bibcode:1998PNAS...95.8660O. doi:10.1073/pnas.95.15.8660. PMC 21132. PMID 9671734.
- Ishiura M, Kutsuna S, Aoki S, Iwasaki H, Andersson CR, Tanabe A, Golden SS, Johnson CH, Kondo T (1998). "Expression of a gene cluster kaiABC as a circadian feedback process in cyanobacteria". Science. 281 (5382): 1519–23. doi:10.1126/science.281.5382.1519. PMID 9727980.
- Johnson CH, Golden SS, Kondo T (1998). "Adaptive significance of circadian programs in cyanobacteria". Trends Microbiol. 6 (10): 407–10. doi:10.1016/s0966-842x(98)01356-0. PMID 9807785.
- Golden SS, Johnson CH, Kondo T (1998). "The cyanobacterial circadian system: a clock apart". Curr Opin Microbiol. 1 (6): 669–73. doi:10.1016/s1369-5274(98)80113-6. PMID 10066545.
- Katayama M, Tsinoremas NF, Kondo T, Golden SS (1999). "cpmA, a gene involved in an output pathway of the cyanobacterial circadian system". J Bacteriol. 181 (11): 3516–24. doi:10.1128/JB.181.11.3516-3524.1999. PMC 93820. PMID 10348865.
- Johnson CH, Golden SS (1999). "Circadian programs in cyanobacteria: adaptiveness and mechanism". Annu Rev Microbiol. 53: 389–409. doi:10.1146/annurev.micro.53.1.389. PMID 10547696.
- Andersson CR, Tsinoremas NF, Shelton J, Lebedeva NV, Yarrow J, Min H, Golden SS (2000). "Application of bioluminescence to the study of circadian rhythms in cyanobacteria". Bioluminescence and Chemiluminescence Part C. Methods in Enzymology. Vol. 305. pp. 527–42. doi:10.1016/s0076-6879(00)05511-7. ISBN 9780121822064. PMID 10812624.
- Williams SB, Vakonakis I, Golden SS, LiWang AC (2002). "Structure and function from the circadian clock protein KaiA of Synechococcus elongatus: a potential clock input mechanism". Proc Natl Acad Sci USA. 99 (24): 15357–62. Bibcode:2002PNAS...9915357W. doi:10.1073/pnas.232517099. PMC 137721. PMID 12438647.
- Ditty JL, Williams SB, Golden SS (2003). "A cyanobacterial circadian timing mechanism". Annu Rev Genet. 37: 513–43. doi:10.1146/annurev.genet.37.110801.142716. PMID 14616072. S2CID 36703896.
- Golden SS (2003). "Timekeeping in bacteria: the cyanobacterial circadian clock". Curr Opin Microbiol. 6 (6): 535–40. doi:10.1016/j.mib.2003.10.012. PMID 14662347.
- Golden SS (2004). "Meshing the gears of the cyanobacterial circadian clock". Proc Natl Acad Sci USA. 101 (38): 13697–8. Bibcode:2004PNAS..10113697G. doi:10.1073/pnas.0405623101. PMC 518819. PMID 15367731.
- Mackey SR, Golden SS (2007). "Winding up the cyanobacterial circadian clock". Trends Microbiol. 15 (9): 381–8. doi:10.1016/j.tim.2007.08.005. PMID 17804240.
- Kim YI, Dong G, Carruthers CW Jr, Golden SS, LiWang A (2008). "The day/night switch in KaiC, a central oscillator component of the circadian clock of cyanobacteria". Proc Natl Acad Sci USA. 105 (35): 12825–30. Bibcode:2008PNAS..10512825K. doi:10.1073/pnas.0800526105. PMC 2529086. PMID 18728181.
- Dong G, Golden SS (2008). "How a cyanobacterium tells time". Curr Opin Microbiol. 11 (6): 541–6. doi:10.1016/j.mib.2008.10.003. PMC 2692899. PMID 18983934.
- Chen Y, Kim YI, Mackey SR, Holtman CK, Liwang A, Golden SS (2009). "A novel allele of kaiA shortens the circadian period and strengthens interaction of oscillator components in the cyanobacterium Synechococcus elongatus PCC 7942". J Bacteriol. 191 (13): 4392–400. doi:10.1128/JB.00334-09. PMC 2698500. PMID 19395479.
- Dong G, Yang Q, Wang Q, Kim YI, Wood TL, Osteryoung KW, van Oudenaarden A, Golden SS (2010). "Elevated ATPase activity of KaiC applies a circadian checkpoint on cell division in Synechococcus elongatus". Cell. 140 (4): 529–39. doi:10.1016/j.cell.2009.12.042. PMC 3031423. PMID 20178745.
- Dong G, Kim YI, Golden SS (2010). "Simplicity and complexity in the cyanobacterial circadian clock mechanism". Curr Opin Genet Dev. 20 (6): 619–25. doi:10.1016/j.gde.2010.09.002. PMC 2982900. PMID 20934870.
- Cohen SE, Golden SS (2015). "Circadian Rhythms in Cyanobacteria". Microbiol Mol Biol Rev. 79 (4): 373–85. doi:10.1128/MMBR.00036-15. PMC 4557074. PMID 26335718.
- Rubin BE, Wetmore KM, Price MN, Diamond S, Shultzaberger RK, Lowe LC, Curtin G, Arkin AP, Deutschbauer A, Golden SS (2015). "The essential gene set of a photosynthetic organism". Proc Natl Acad Sci USA. 112 (48): E6634–43. Bibcode:2015PNAS..112E6634R. doi:10.1073/pnas.1519220112. PMC 4672817. PMID 26508635.
- Tseng R, Goularte NF, Chavan A, Luu J, Cohen SE, Chang YG, Heisler J, Li S, Michael AK, Tripathi S, Golden SS, LiWang A, Partch CL (2017). "Structural basis of the day-night transition in a bacterial circadian clock". Science. 355 (6330): 1174–1180. Bibcode:2017Sci...355.1174T. doi:10.1126/science.aag2516. PMC 5441561. PMID 28302851.
