= Circadian advantage =

A circadian advantage is an advantage gained when an organism's biological cycles are in tune with its surroundings. It is not a well studied phenomenon, but it is known to occur in certain types of cyanobacteria, whose endogenous cycles, or circadian rhythm, "resonates" or aligns with their environment. It is known to occur in plants also, suggesting that any organism which is able to attune its natural growth cycles with its environment will have a competitive advantage over those that do not. Circadian advantage may also refer to sporting teams gaining an advantage by acclimatizing to the time zone where a match is played.

== In organisms ==
In the context of bacterial circadian rhythms, specifically in cyanobacteria, circadian advantage refers to the improved survival of strains of cyanobacteria whose endogenous cycles "resonate" or align with the environmental circadian rhythm. For example, consider a strain with a free-running period (FRP) of 24 hours that is co-cultured with a strain that has a free-running period (FRP) of 30 hours in a light-dark cycle of 12 hours light and 12 hours dark (LD 12:12). The strain that has a 24 hour FRP will out-compete the 30 hour strain over time.

Competition studies in plants provide another example of circadian advantage. These studies have shown that an endogenous clock that resonates with environmental cycles leads to a competitive advantage in Arabidopsis thaliana. Experiments with wild type, short circadian period mutants, and long circadian period mutants demonstrated that plants with a circadian period that is optimally synchronized to the environment grew fastest. The same study also showed that photosynthetic carbon fixation was directly correlated to "circadian resonance". A different study discovered that genes involved in photosynthetic reactions of A. thaliana are under clock control. mRNAs that encode chlorophyll binding proteins and the enzyme protoporphyrin IX magnesium chelatase involved in chlorophyll synthesis were cycling. The "circadian resonance" increase in productivity may arise from appropriate anticipation of sunrise and sunset, allowing for timely synthesis of light-harvesting complex proteins and chlorophyll. Therefore, the competitive advantage in A. thaliana further supports the idea that anticipation of environmental changes leads to enhanced fitness.

Rhodopseudomonas palustris is another example of the advantage in having a biological timing system that interacts with the environmental cycles. While the only prokaryotic group with a well-known circadian timekeeping mechanism is the cyanobacteria, recent discoveries involving R. palustris have suggested alternative timekeeping mechanisms among the prokaryotes. R. palustris is a purple non-sulfur bacterium that has KaiB and KaiC genes and exhibit adaptive kaiC-dependent growth in 24h cyclic environments. However, R. palustris was reported to show a poorly self-sustained intrinsic rhythm, and kaiC-dependent growth enhancement was not present under constant conditions. The R. palustris system was proposed as a "proto" circadian timekeeper that exhibit some parts of circadian systems (kaiB and kaiC homologs), but not all.

Likewise, research on the endogenous circadian timekeeping mechanisms in mice further supports that "circadian resonance" is evolutionarily adaptive. One study in particular compared the fitness of wild-type mice with mutant mice which had a short free-running circadian cycle. These mice had a mutation in the casein kinase 1Ɛ gene, which encodes an enzyme that is integral in controlling circadian cycle length. A mixed group of wild-type and mutant mice were then released in an outdoor experimental enclosure and, following a fourteen month timespan, the mice were monitored. The wild-type mice both survived longer and reproduced at a greater rate than the mutant mice. In fact, the mutant genotype was strongly selected against, thereby suggesting natural selection towards those genotypes that are resonant with the natural LD cycle.

It is possible that circadian clocks play a role in the gut microbiota behavior. These microorganisms experience daily changes correlated with daily light/dark and temperature cycles. This occurs through behaviors such as eating rhythms on a daily routine (consumption in the day for diurnal animals and in the night for nocturnal animals). The presence of a daily timekeeper might give those bacteria a competitive advantage over others. By allowing the bacteria to sense resources coming from the host in order to prepare and metabolize them faster. There are bacteria that have daily timekeepers, and it may be possible that the microbiota have endogenous clocks which communicate with biological clocks of the host. For instance, if there are some time-keeping qualities of the microorganisms within the intestines, it might be possible that they can affect the circadian system of the host. An endogenous clock may be present in some microbial species, and the presence of such an intrinsic timekeeper could be beneficial both in the gut (which experiences daily changes in nutrient availability) and the environment outside of the host (which experiences daily cycles of light and temperature).

== In sport ==
In competitive sport, a circadian advantage is a team's advantage over another by virtue of its relative degree of acclimation to a time zone versus their opponent. While this concept was explored by researchers at Stanford in 1997, and at the University of Massachusetts, the term was coined in 2004 by Dr. W. Christopher Winter, a sleep specialist and neurologist studying the effects of travel between time zones on Major League Baseball (MLB) performance. This study was expanded into a ten-year retrospective study with a grant through MLB that was completed by Dr. Winter and his research assistant Noah H. Green, then an undergraduate student at the University of Virginia. The work was presented in 2008 at the 22nd Annual Meeting of the Associated Professional Sleep Societies in Baltimore, Maryland.

Using the convention that for every time zone crossed, synchronization to that time zone requires one day, teams can be analyzed during a season to see where they are in terms of being acclimated to their time zone of play. For example, consider the Washington Nationals. If they have been competing at home for the last 3 days or more, they would be completely acclimated to Eastern Standard Time (EST). If they were to travel to Los Angeles, upon arrival they would be 3 hours off, because they traveled 3 time zones west. Every 24 hours spent on the west coast, would bring them 1 hour closer to acclimation. So after 24 hours in Los Angeles, they would be 2 hours off. After 48 hours, they would be 1 hour off, and after 72 hours, they would be acclimated to west coast time and would stay that way until they left their time zone.

Unlike home field advantage which is present any time two teams play a game that is not held in a neutral site, circadian advantage does not apply to all games. In a typical MLB season, it applies to approximately 20% of games played with the other 80% featuring teams at equal circadian advantage. In sports that allow more time between games, it may apply to significantly fewer games. Circadian advantage is much more of an issue in sports that feature significant international travel.

Circadian advantage is most significant when a team holds a 3-hour advantage (or more) over another. This matchup is only encountered after very long flights where the traveling team plays soon after arrival, most commonly coast-to-coast flights in major North American and Australian leagues. As the magnitude of time zone differences between two teams becomes smaller, so too does circadian advantage.

In 2018, pilot data collected by Walter Reed Army Institute of Research, presented at the American Academy of Sleep Medicine's annual SLEEP meeting, suggested National Football League teams perform better at night versus the day as a result of circadian advantage. It also indicated that teams had fewer turnovers at night.
