= KaiB =

Gene found in various cyanobacteria

Identifiers
- Organism: Synechococcus elongatus
- Symbol: kaiB
- Entrez: 31251
- RefSeq (mRNA): NM_080317
- RefSeq (Prot): NP_525056
- UniProt: P07663

Other data
- Chromosome: X: 2.58 - 2.59 Mb
Search for
- Structures: Swiss-model
- Domains: InterPro

KaiB is a gene located in the highly-conserved kaiABC gene cluster of various cyanobacterial species. Along with KaiA and KaiC, KaiB plays a central role in operation of the cyanobacterial circadian clock. Discovery of the Kai genes marked the first-ever identification of a circadian oscillator in a prokaryotic species. Moreover, characterization of the cyanobacterial clock demonstrated the existence of transcription-independent, post-translational mechanisms of rhythm generation, challenging the universality of the transcription-translation feedback loop model of circadian rhythmicity.

== Discovery ==
=== Prokaryotic circadian rhythms ===
Circadian rhythms - endogenous, entrainable oscillations in biological processes with periods that roughly correspond to the 24-hour day – were once believed to be an exclusive property of eukaryotic lifeforms. Prokaryotes were thought to lack the cellular complexity to maintain persistent, temperature-compensated timekeeping. In addition, the widely supported "circadian- infradian rule" stipulated that cellular functions could only be coupled to a circadian oscillator in cells dividing only as fast as once in a 24-hour period. Prokaryotes, which often undergo cellular division multiple times in a single day, failed to meet this condition.

Over time, mounting evidence began to challenge this assertion and supported the existence of a bacterial circadian rhythm. For example, discrete temporal separation of photosynthesis and nitrogen fixation observed in cyanobacteria suggested the existence of some mechanism of circadian control. Finally, in 1986 Tan-Chi Huang and colleagues discovered and characterized robust, 24-hour rhythms of nitrogen fixation in Synechococcus cyanobacteria, demonstrating circadian rhythmicity in a prokaryotic species. Following these discoveries, chronobiologists set out to identify the molecular mechanisms governing operation of the cyanobacterial clock.

=== Discovery of the cyanobacterial clock ===
Takao Kondo, Masahiro Ishiura, Susan Golden, Carl Johnson, and their colleagues used bacterial luciferase, a reporter for gene expression, on the gene psbAI to monitor the activity of this clock gene found in Synechococcus cyanobacteria. The transformation of a 44 hour long-period clock mutant, C44a, with wild-type (WT) genomic DNA library in a plasmid vector allowed testing for “rescue clones” with a normal period of 25 hours. When the DNA library from this rescued clone was placed into a plasmid at the original site, C44a was found to be completely rescued. One single gene cluster, kaiABC, was found to be rhythmic in nature when the fragment of the plasmid responsible for rescue was sequenced. kaiABC is composed of three individual genes: kaiA, kaiB, and kaiC. Examination of rescue patterns in over 50 clock mutants showing either short periods, long periods or arrhythmia revealed restoration to WT phenotype in all mutants. Further sequencing revealed 19 total kaiABC specific mutants, 14 of which had mutations in kaiC, 3 in kaiA, and 2 in kaiB. The mutant phenotypes being all caused by a single amino acid substitution on one of the aforementioned genes determined that Kai proteins play a significant role in the Synechococcus circadian clock.

Initially, it was thought that a transcription-translation feedback loop was necessary in creating circadian rhythms so it was believed that kaiABC would have this function as well. However, it was later discovered that inhibition of kaiBC mRNA accumulation using a transcription or translation inhibitor did not prevent the circadian cycling of kaiC phosphorylation. Thus, it is the case that cyanobacterial clock rhythmicity is independent of both transcription and translation. Additionally, experiments were conducted to test the self-sustainable oscillation of KaiC phosphorylation, which is important in the regulation of the kaiABC gene cluster. By incubating KaiC together with KaiA and KaiB, as well as ATP, the temperature compensation aspect of the KaiABC clock was proved. Additionally, such circadian periods seen in kaiC in vivo mutants were also observed in in vitro strains.

== Evolutionary history ==
Cyanobacteria are a group of photosynthetic, nitrogen-fixing bacteria that are known to be one of the first life forms on Earth, and are thought to have emerged at least 3,500 million years ago (Mya). They are the only known oxidative photosynthetic prokaryotes. Cyanobacteria use circadian clocks to regulate nitrogen-fixation, cell division, and other metabolic processes. The vast majority of cyanobacterial genes are expressed in a circadian fashion, generally falling into Class I (dusk-peaking) and Class II (dawn-peaking) categories depending on their specific function.

The rhythmic expression of cyanobacterial genes is driven by oscillation in the phosphorylation state of the Kai oscillator and its interaction with various output mechanisms. The evolution of the three kai genes – kaiA, kaiB, and kaiC – remains an area of active study. Recent phylogenetic evidence suggests that the kai genes emerged sequentially: kaiC nearly 3,800 Mya, kaiB between 3,500-2,3200 Mya, and kaiA most recently around 1,000 Mya. The fusion of kaiC and kaiB into an operon under the control of a single promoter occurred shortly after kaiB’s appearance in the genome.

While all three kai genes are independently required for sustained circadian rhythmicity in cyanobacteria, the kaiA gene is restricted to a group of higher-order cyanobacteria. For example, while the Synechococcus and Prochlorococcus cyanobacterial genera are closely related, kaiA is absent in Prochlorococcus species. Cyanobacteria lacking kaiA demonstrate oscillations in gene expression and cell cycle progression, but these rhythms are not self-sustaining and rapidly disappear under constant conditions.

Contrasting cyanobacterial species lacking kai genes, some members of the Synechococcus family express paralogs of kaiB and kaiC referred to as kaiC2, kaiB2, kaiC3, and kaiB3. The function this expanded set of clock genes remains speculative, but current evidence suggests these paralogs help to fine-tune a central circadian rhythm established by kaiA, kaiB1, and kaiC1.

Orthologs of kaiB and kaiC genes have been identified in some species of Archaea and Pseudomonadota. Likely originating from lateral transfer, some of these orthologs – particularly in cases where kaiB and kaiC are coincident - have been tentatively implicated in rudimentary timekeeping mechanisms. Others play roles in strikingly divergent cellular processes, such as the Legionella pneumophila oxidative and salt stress responses.

== Function ==
=== Role in the circadian clock ===
The core cyanobacterial circadian oscillator, encoded by the kaiA, kaiB, and kaiC genes, regulates global patterns of gene expression and governs essential cellular processes including photosynthesis and cell division. Cyclic, sequential rhythms of KaiC phosphorylation and dephosphorylation constitute the oscillator’s timekeeping mechanism both in vivo and in vitro.

KaiC is organized as a ring-shaped homohexamer. Each monomer component contains four essential structural motifs: a CI domain, a CII domain, a B-loop binding domain, and a tail that protrudes from the C-terminus known as the A-loop. Because the CI and CII domains are aligned in the KaiC hexamer, they are collectively referred to as the CI and CII rings. KaiC has both intrinsic autokinase and autophosphate activity, each of which can be modulated by KaiA and KaiB binding. In particular, the phosphorylation and dephosphorylation of residues Ser431 and Thr432 in the CII ring drive circadian rhythms in the Kai oscillator.

At the start of the subjective day, the Ser431 and Thr432 residues of the KaiC hexamer are unphosphorylated, and the A-loop domains of its constituent monomers are exposed. KaiA binds to the A-loop domain of KaiC, promoting autokinase activity. Phosphorylation of the protein occurs in an ordered, sequential manner – Thr432 is phosphorylated first, followed by Ser431. Phosphorylation of the Ser431 residue drives a significant conformational change in the KaiC hexamer. The CI and CII rings of the protein complex stack more tightly, exposing the previously occluded B-loop. The B-loop in turn recruits KaiB, which simultaneously binds to KaiA and KaiC. KaiB binding removes KaiA from the A-loop, and in turn both promotes the autophosphatase activity of KaiC and inhibits its autokinase activity. Dephosphorylation of KaiC occurs in the subjective night, and proceeds in the reverse order of phosphorylation; Thr432 is dephosphorylated before Ser431.

Ultimately, these circadian rhythms in KaiC phosphorylation governed by KaiA and KaiB binding create a post-translation oscillator that can interact with both input pathways to entrain to changing environmental conditions and output pathways to mediate transcriptional events.

Cyclic rhythms in phosphorylation of the KaiC hexamer serve as a timekeeping mechanism for the cyanobacterial Kai oscillator. Circles shaded red represent phosphorylated residues.

=== Circadian outputs and KaiB fold switching ===
Though the Kai oscillator is capable of generating endogenous rhythms in phosphorylation, it does not directly influence gene expression; none of the Kai proteins possess DNA-binding domains. Instead, a two-component system consisting of SasA, a histidine kinase, and RpaA, a transcription factor, connect changes in KaiC phosphorylation to transcriptional events.

SasA can bind to the exposed B-loop of the KaiC molecule upon phosphorylation of the Ser431 residue. This interaction drives SasA autophosphorylation and subsequent phosphotransfer to RpaA. Phospho-RpaA activates the expression of dusking-peaking (Class 1) genes and represses the expression of dawn-peaking (Class 2) genes. Conversely, unphosphorylated RpaA represses the expression of Class 1 genes. As a result, rhythmic phosphorylation of the transcription factor, driven by the Kai oscillator and associated SasA activity, produces rhythmic patterns in gene expression.

KaiB serves as a major regulator of the SasA-RpaA pathway, and exhibits structural adaptations that both contribute to circadian rhythm generation and facilitate interaction with SasA and KaiC. The majority of KaiB expressed in cyanobacteria exists as an inactive homotetramer, incapable of interacting with KaiC. The KaiB tetramer exists in equilibrium with a monomeric form of the protein. However, monomeric KaiB must undergo a radical change in tertiary structure to associate with KaiC, shifting from a so-called ground state conformation (gs-KaiB) to a fold-switched conformation (fs-KaiB) capable of binding to the KaiC B-loop. To date, KaiB is the only known metamorphic clock protein – a class of proteins capable of reversible fold-switching.

Fs-KaiB has a thioredoxin-like fold that closely resembles the N-terminus of SasA, and competitively displaces the kinase’s binding to KaiC. However, the conformation change from gs-KaiB to fs-KaiB occurs slowly, permitting SasA binding to KaiC and downstream activation of RpaA from midday – when the B-loop first becomes exposed - until dusk. As a result, phospho-RpaA accumulates as the day progresses and peaks near dusk, appropriately timing increases in the expression of Class 1 genes. Moreover, this time-lag in KaiB binding delays the onset of autophosphatase activity in KaiC, contributing to the circadian period of the cyanobacterial oscillator.

=== Regulation of the Kai oscillator ===
While rhythmicity in the KaiABC oscillator can be reconstituted in vitro, the clock is subject to various additional levels of regulation in vivo. For example, a stoichiometric ratio of clock components must be maintained to preserve rhythmicity. kaiB and kaiC – whose transcript and protein levels oscillate considerable over the course of the day - constitute an operon under the control of a single promoter and are transcribed as a polycistronic mRNA. By contrast, protein levels of KaiA, which lies under the control of an independent promoter, remain fairly across a 24-hour period.

In addition, the phase of the Kai oscillator can be shifted in response to environmental changes. However, unlike phase-shifting mechanisms characterized in eukaryotic organisms, photopigments do not appear to play a role in entrainment of the cyanobacterial clock. Instead, identified input mechanisms rely on biochemical changes that track photosynthetic reactions performed by the cyanobacterium, reactions that exhibit rate increases proportional to ambient light intensity. CikA and LdpA, for example, sense the redox state of the intracellular environment and relay changes to the Kai oscillator. In addition, KaiA and KaiC appear to directly detect metabolites of photosynthesis – specifically quinone and ATP – and adjust the phase of the oscillator accordingly. To date, KaiB has not been implicated in an input pathway capable of entraining the cyanobacterial clock.

== Current research ==
Both Dr. Carl Johnson’s lab at Vanderbilt University and Dr. Michael Rust’s lab at the University of Chicago have research efforts focused on the KaiABC complex. The Johnson lab, in collaboration with Dr. Hassane Mchaourab’s lab, focuses on using biophysical methods to explain how the cyanobacteria clock oscillates in vitro. Additionally, they hope to discover the adaptive significance of circadian rhythms using clock gene mutants of cyanobacteria. The Rust lab is researching how the interactions of proteins, neurotransmitters, and ion gradients produce the behavior of living cyanobacteria cells, using a combination of techniques such as advanced biochemical microscopy and mathematical modeling.

== See also ==
- Bacterial circadian rhythms
- Circadian rhythm
- Chronobiology
- Cyanobacteria
- KaiC
- KaiA
- Oscillation
- Phosphorylation
- Synechococcus
