= Carl H. Johnson =

American-born biologist

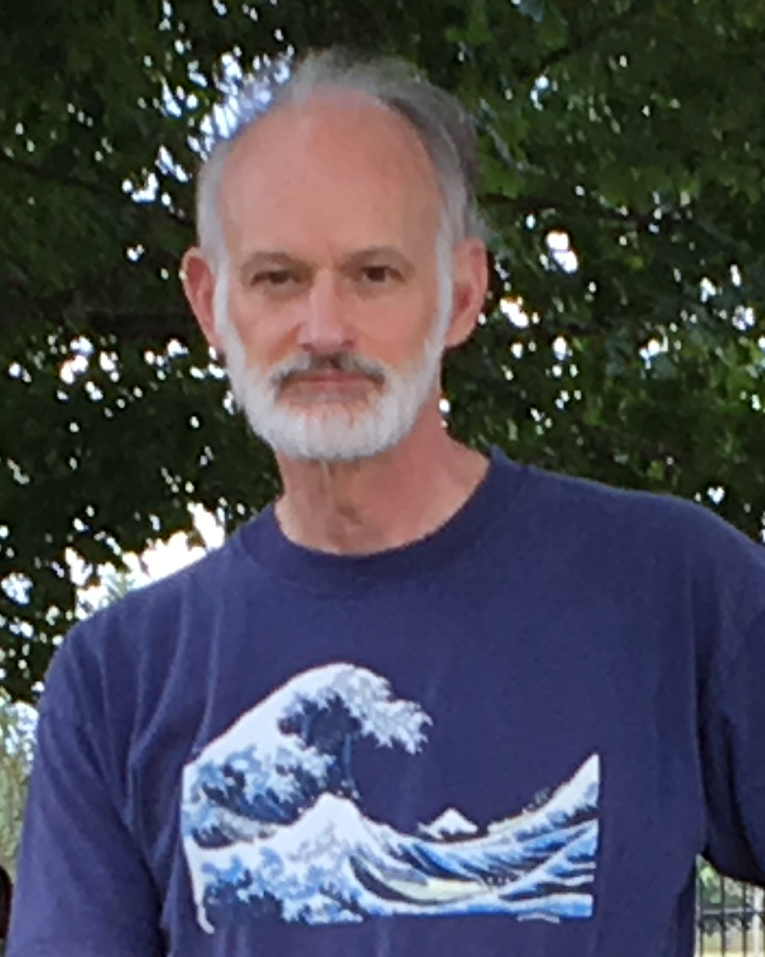
- Born: Washington, D.C.
- Education: University of Texas at Austin; Stanford University; Harvard University
- Scientific career
- Fields: Biology, Circadian rhythm
- Workplaces: Vanderbilt University
- Doctoral advisor: David Epel; Colin Pittendrigh
- Other academic advisors: Michael Menaker

Carl Hirschie Johnson is an American-born biologist who researches the chronobiology of different organisms, most notably the bacterial circadian rhythms of cyanobacteria. Johnson completed his undergraduate degree in Honors Liberal Arts at the University of Texas at Austin, and later earned his PhD in biology from Stanford University, where he began his research under the mentorship of Dr. Colin Pittendrigh. Currently, Johnson is the Stevenson Professor of Biological Sciences at Vanderbilt University.

== Personal life ==
Carl Johnson was born in Washington D.C. When he first began college at the University of Texas at Austin, he planned to go to medical school rather than pursue research. However, he quickly developed a passion for research after working as an undergraduate student in a chronobiology lab directed by Dr. Michael Menaker. Johnson asserts that "music led [him] to science," as he originally began his research job with Menaker to pay for classical voice lessons. Classical music has remained a major avocation, as he continues to sing music with the chorus of the Nashville Symphony Orchestra. Also in his free time, he enjoys yoga.

== Scientific career ==
=== Early career and education ===
Johnson graduated with a B.A. in Honors Liberal Arts (the Plan II Honors program) at the University of Texas at Austin in 1976. During this time, he became involved in undergraduate research under the mentorship of Dr. Michael Menaker, whose lab was studying biological clocks in birds and rodents. Johnson's exposure to the practice of experimental research in Dr. Menaker's lab inspired him to go to graduate school instead of following his original plan to become a physician. He went on to earn his Ph.D. in biology in 1982 at Stanford University, first working under the renowned leader in chronobiology, Colin Pittendrigh and then moving to David Epel's laboratory to finish his degree. Subsequently, Johnson conducted postdoctoral work in Cell & Developmental Biology at Harvard University, which he completed in 1987, with Dr. J.W. 'Woody' Hastings (John Woodland Hastings), a biologist famous for his work on bioluminescence in many organisms, including algae. Hastings became a close friend and mentor to Johnson. In 1987, Johnson came to Vanderbilt University to initiate an independent research program, and he has been a biology professor at Vanderbilt since then.

=== Research beginnings ===
Johnson's initial foray into research was as an undergraduate in Menaker's lab, which was working on the pineal gland in birds and other chronobiology projects in vertebrates. In graduate school at Stanford under Colin Pittendrigh, Johnson attempted to discover circadian rhythms in a variety of organism such as leeches and cockroaches. He also worked with earthworms to see whether they would completely recover circadian rhythms upon regeneration of lesioned parts of their brains. He also developed a method to measure the pH levels inside cells in search of rhythmic acid/base relationships. However, only one of these projects ultimately resulted in a publication, namely a paper about the clock's control over the pH in the bread mould Neurospora crassa. Johnson switched to David Epel's marine biology lab in his fourth year of graduate school, because their work on the pH change in sea urchin and starfish eggs upon fertilization was an excellent system in which to apply the method he had developed earlier to measure the pH levels inside cells. He successfully published a number of papers on this topic. In his postdoctoral studies with Hastings, Johnson returned to the biological clocks field and worked mainly on rhythms in the bioluminescent alga Gonyaulax polyedra and later in the algal model system for genetics, Chlamydomonas reinhardtii.

=== Major contributions ===
==== Circadian system in cyanobacteria ====
Prior to the late 1980s, most chronobiologists believed that bacteria were too "simple" to express circadian rhythms. Johnson did not accept this dogma, and as early as 1978, he was examining haloarchaea for the possible presence of biological clocks. While the studies of haloarchaea were not productive, when other studies suggested the possibility of circadian rhythms in cyanobacteria, Johnson along with colleagues and collaborators used a luciferase reporter system to prove that Synechococcus elongatus, of the phylum cyanobacteria, showed evidence of daily bacterial circadian rhythms (with circa-24 hour cycles). Synechococcus expressed free-running rhythms, temperature compensation, and ability to entrain, which are the defining properties of circadian rhythms. These organisms also regulate cell division with forbidden and allowed phases. Therefore, Johnson and coworkers challenged the original belief that bacteria do not have daily biological cycles. Moreover, they identified the central elements of the bacterial clock, namely the KaiABC gene cluster, and determined their structure. Currently, the idea that bacterial circadian rhythms exist in at least some prokaryotes is well accepted by the chronobiology community, and prokaryotes are an important model system for studying rhythmicity.

==== Bioluminescence Resonance Energy Transfer (BRET) ====
In 1999, Johnson and his team developed and patented a new method of studying the interaction of molecules based on Förster resonance energy transfer (FRET), also known as Fluorescent Resonance Energy Transfer (FRET). They modified the existing technique of FRET so that instead of using light to activate fluorophores attached to the proteins of interest, they employed bioluminescent proteins with luciferase activity. BRET eliminates the need for light excitation and so avoids changes that light generally causes in circadian clocks, such as resetting the clock phase. Because it avoids light excitation (as in the case of FRET), BRET can also be helpful (1) when tissues are autofluorescent, (2) when light excitation causes phototoxicity, photoresponses (as in retina), or photobleaching, and (3) in partnership with optogenetics. This new method for measuring protein-protein interactions gives researchers the ability to develop novel reporters for intracellular calcium and hydrogen ions. This method is projected to be extremely useful for researchers dealing with live cell cultures, cell extracts and purified proteins.

=== Current work ===
The Johnson Lab is currently applying biophysical methods to explain how the central bacterial clock proteins (KaiA + KaiB + KaiC) oscillate in vitro. Together with the laboratory of Dr. Martin Egli, Dr. Johnson's lab has led a concerted effort to apply structural biology techniques for insight into circadian clock mechanisms. The lab has also used mutants and codon bias in cyanobacteria to provide the first rigorous evidence for the adaptive significance of biological clocks in fitness. The Johnson lab is expanding the study of bacterial circadian rhythms from cyanobacteria to purple bacteria. Currently the lab is also conducting studies on the circadian system of mammals in vivo and in vitro, by using luminescence as a tool to monitor circadian rhythms in the brain. Finally, Johnson and his lab is studying circadian and sleep phenotypes of mouse models of the serious human neurodevelopmental disorder called Angelman syndrome. The lab hopes to find chronotherapeutic ways to ameliorate the sleep disorders of patients with this syndrome.

=== Timeline ===
- 1982: Graduated from Stanford University with Ph.D. in Biology
- 1987: Completed Postdoc in Cell & Developmental Biology (Harvard)
- 1987 - 1994: Assistant Professor in Department of Biology, Vanderbilt University
- 1994 - 1999: Associate Professor in Department of Biology, Vanderbilt University
- 1999–present: Professor in Department of Biological Studies, Vanderbilt University
- 1993: Published first paper on circadian rhythms in cyanobacteria
- 1995–present: Serves as a member of Journal of Biological Rhythms' editorial board
- 2005: Received Chancellor's Research Award, Vanderbilt University
- 2012 - 2014: President of Society for Research on Biological Rhythms

=== Positions and honors ===
- President of the Society for Research on Biological Rhythms (2012-2014)
- Chancellor's Research Award, Vanderbilt University (2005)
- Aschoff and Honma Prize in Biological Rhythms Research (2014)
- Secretary and treasurer, Society for Research on Biological Rhythms
- Phi Beta Kappa Society

== See also ==
- Michael Menaker
- Circadian rhythms
- Chronobiology
- Cyanobacteria
- Bacterial circadian rhythms
