= KaiA =

Gene found in cyanobacteria

kaiA

Identifiers
- Organism: S. elongatus
- Symbol: kaiA
- UniProt: Q79PF6
Search for
- Structures: Swiss-model
- Domains: InterPro

kaiA is a gene in the "kaiABC" gene cluster that plays a crucial role in the regulation of bacterial circadian rhythms, such as in the cyanobacterium Synechococcus elongatus. For these bacteria, regulation of kaiA expression is critical for circadian rhythm, which determines the twenty-four-hour biological rhythm. In addition, KaiA functions with a negative feedback loop in relation with kaiB and KaiC. The kaiA gene makes KaiA protein that enhances phosphorylation of KaiC while KaiB inhibits activity of KaiA.

== History ==
=== Discovery ===
Circadian rhythms have been discovered in a diversity of organisms. These rhythms control a variety of physiological activities and help organisms to adapt to environmental conditions. Cyanobacteria are the most primitive organisms that demonstrate a circadian oscillation. Cyanobacteria clocks were first founded in Blue Green Algae with the oldest known fossils about 3.5 billion years old. Masahiro Ishiura, Susan Golden, Carl H. Johnson, Takao Kondo and their colleagues were the individuals who found that the minimal cyanobacteria clock consists of 3 proteins: KaiA, KaiB, and KaiC. (Note: kai means cycle in Japanese.) The experiment performed by Kondo consisted of attaching the luciferase gene and performing mutagenesis. This was the first identification of possible genes that could reconstitute a biological clock within cyanobacteria, of which KaiA was included.

Cyanobacteria were the first prokaryotes reported to have a circadian clock. For the adaptation of cyanobacteria, circadian clock genes exhibit forms of significant importance since they regulate fundamental physical processes such as regulation of nitrogen fixation, cell division, and photosynthesis. Early KaiA research was conducted in the 1998 research article, “Expression of a Gene Cluster kaiABC as a Circadian Feedback Process in Cyanobacteria,” where it details the functions of the gene cluster and KaiA in that it sustains the oscillations by enhancing Kai C expression. KaiA was discovered while studying the clock mutations in Synechococcus by using bacteria luciferase as a reporter on clock controlled gene expression. This was the first instance where scientists first proposed a mechanism and a naming system for KaiA and the kaiABC gene cluster.

=== Notable research ===
Researchers Masato Nakajima, Keiko Imai, Hiroshi Ito, Taeko Nishiwaki, Yoriko Murayama, Hideo Iwasaki, Tokitaka Oyama, and Takao Kondo conducted the experiment "Reconstitution of Circadian Oscillation of Cyanobacterial KaiC Phosphorylation in Vitro" took KaiA, KaiB, and KaiC and put them in tube with ATP, MgCl_{2} and buffers only. They used radioactive ATP and the phosphorylated form of KaiC which runs a bit faster than unphosphorylated KaiC. They saw a twenty-four-hour rhythm in autohydrolyzation of KaiC. The system is also temperature compensated and was noteworthy because they only needed three proteins, including KaiA, for twenty-four-hour rhythm.

Research published in the paper, “Robust and Tunable Circadian Rhythms From Differentially Sensitive Catalytic Domains,” done by Connie Phong, Joseph S. Markson, Crystal M. Wilhoite, and Michael J. Rust, shows the mathematical relationship of KaiA and KaiC where KaiA stimulates the phosphorylation of KaiC. Additionally, KaiB sequesters KaiA, which promotes KaiC dephosphorylation.

In addition, “In Vitro Regulation of Circadian phosphorylation rhythm of cyanobacterial clock protein KaiC, KaiA, and KaiB,” shows the entrainment mechanism of cellular circadian clock with circadian rhythm in response to intracellular levels of KaiA and the other Kai proteins. KaiA ratios to KaiB and KaiC express a circadian rhythm and guides phosphorylation of KaiC based on KaiA ratios that can entrain in different light dark conditions.

=== Evolutionary history ===
Cyanobacteria were one of the oldest organisms on earth and most successful in regards to ecological plasticity and adaptability. Dvornyk performed phylogenetic analysis of kai genes and found that the kai genes have different evolutionary histories the feedback loop that kaiA is in evolved about 1,000 Mya. Minimal amount of kaiA genes prohibits a full dating of their evolution. Since they are found only in some higher cyanobacteria, kaiA genes are the youngest in comparison to kaiB and kaiC, evolutionarily speaking. Synechococcus sp. PCC7942 has kaiA whereas P.marinus does not, even though they are closely related unicellular organisms, further demonstrating the evolutionary youth of the kaiA gene. KaiA genes are also found in the genomes of the species of the kaiC subtree, in younger clades than Prochlorococcus. Thus kaiA genes most likely arrived after the speciation of Synechococcus and Prochlorococcus, about 1,051 ± 1,16.9 and 944 ± 92.9 Mya.

KaiA genes are located only in cyanobacteria with a length ranging from a filamentous cyanobacteria (Anabaena and Nostoc) to unicellular cyanobacteria (Synechoccus and Synechocytis), which are 852-900 bp longer. The KaiA genes are the least conserved amongst the kai genes. Shorter homologs of kaiA and kaiB genes match only 1 segment of their longer versions closer to the 3’ terminus, unlike kaiC genes. This implies kaiA and kaiB most likely didn’t evolve through duplication. Specifically, the kaiA gene only had a single copy.

== Genetics and protein structure ==
KaiA statistics: 284 amino acids; Molecular mass of 32.6 kD; Isoelectric point of 4.69.

The Kai proteins do not share a similar sequence to any eukaryotic clock protein, even though fundamental processes do resemble those of eukaryotic organisms (such as light resetting phase, temperature compensation, ad free running period). Kai genes are found in almost all cyanobacteria. Williams found that 6 of the annotated cyanobacterial genomes had 2 contiguous ORFs maintaining homology to S. elongates kaiB and kaiC genes. Of these sequence associations, only four kaiA genes are distinguishable, thus making it the most sequence diversified of the kai genes. The Synechocystis sp. Strain PCC 6803 genome has only one kaiA gene, whereas multiple are found in kaiB and kaiC. KaiB and kaiC homologues can be found in other eubacteria and archaea, but kaiA appears to only be found in cyanobacteria (currently the only prokaryotes with 24-hour biological oscillation).

KaiA Three functional domains:

1) N-terminal domain (amplitude-amplifier)

2) Central period-adjuster domain

3) C-terminal clock-oscillator domain

The C-terminal domain assists in dimer formation, thus allowing KaiA to bind to KaiC. This further enhances KaiC phosphorylation. (see functions below)

Located at the center of the concave portion of KaiA is residue His270, which is essential to KaiA function.

=== Mutations ===
There are 3 mutations of 19 mutants (single amino substitutions) found in kaiA found from direct sequencing of the cluster. Thus, the cluster as well as the Kai proteins have necessary functions for the circadian clock of Synechococcus. IPTG induced overexpression of kaiA led to arrhythmicity, demonstrating that rhythmicity requires the expression of kaiA as well as the other genes. Mutagenesis of kaiA reveals that there are rarely short-period mutations, but an abundance of long period mutations. Specifically, Nishimura found that there are 301 long period mutations, 92 arrhythmic mutants, and only a single short period mutation. Thus Nishimura concluded that kaiA mutations usually lead to an extension of the period. An exception would be the mutant F224S in which a short period of 22h was found in KaiA. KaiA mutant periods ranged up to 50h in which some mutants demonstrated arrythmicity. KaiA mutations seem to selectively alter period length demonstrating that kaiA can regulate period. Further, kaiA proteins can regulate the length of a period of the circadian oscillation regardless of whether kaiBC was activated or not . Long periods were caused by mutation within kaiA as well as the lowering of kaiBC expression.

KaiA has been found to enhance kaiBC expression. It is postulated that certain mutant kaiA proteins failed to sustain rhythmicity due to a lack of activation of kaiBC expression. Nishimura found that most KaiA mutations decreased PkaiBC activity to different levels. This is consistent with the finding that kaiA proteins enhance kaiBC activity. His experiment further suggested that kaiA is a part of the phase resetting mechanism of the cyanobacterial clock. Mutations that mapped to cluster regions of kaiA led to long period phenotypes, thus suggesting that kaiA cluster regions play a role in regulating the period length of circadian oscillation. Regions of KaiA that increase kaiBC expression (allowing for rhythm) are most likely not in cluster regions because arrhythmic mutants (C53S, V76A, F178S, F224S, F274K) were mapped to different part of kaiA. Williams postulated that the KaiA135N is a pseudo-receiver domain is a timing input device that controls KaiA stimulation of KaiC autophosphorylation, thus crucial for circadian oscillation.

=== Types of KaiA proteins ===
There appear to be long and short types of kaiA proteins. The long type, gathered from S.elongatus, Synechocystis sp. Strain PCC 5803, and Synechococcus sp. Strain WH8108, has about 300 aminoacyl residues. A high degree of conservation is observed in the carboxyl terminal 100 residues. Independent carboxyl-terminal domains are the short versions, from the filamentous species Anabaena sp. Strain PCC 7120 and Nostoc punctiforme. There are two independently folded domains of the kaiA protein: KaiA180C (amino terminal with a mainly alpha helical structure) and KaiA189N domain (carboxyl terminal domain, corresponding to residues 1-189). The S. elongates kaiA protein appears to have two domains, the amino and carboxyl regions, connected by a helical linker of about 50 residues.

== Function ==
Cyanobacteria displays a circadian clock system in which three protein oscillators, KaiA, KaiB, and KaiC, constitute a system known as a post-translational oscillator (PTO) that facilitates the oscillation of the larger transcription translation negative feedback loop (TTFL). The TTFL drives gene expression and replenishes KaiA, KaiB, and KaiC, while the PTO constitutes the core of the circadian clock of cyanobacteria. This Kai core confers circadian rhythmicity to ATP hydrolysis activity and kinase/phosphatase activity, both of which are temperature compensated. Additionally, KaiB and KaiC, but not KaiA, have a circadian rhythm of 24 hours in experimental conditions, such as free-running in conditions of constant light.

=== Phosphorylation oscillation ===
The Kai proteins that comprise the PTO generate a circadian clock of oscillating phosphorylation/dephosphorylation with a period of around 24 hours. The KaiC protein is an enzyme with two specific phosphorylation sites, Threonine 432 and Serine 431, which express rhythmicity in phosphorylation/dephosphorylation, depending on KaiA and KaiB activity. KaiA stimulates the phosphorylation of KaiC until KaiB sequesters KaiA, initiating dephosphorylation in a determined sequence on Threonine 432 and Serine 431: KaiA stimulates autophosphorylation by KaiC on Threonine 432, and Serine 431 then follows this mechanism of phosphorylation. When both Threonine 432 and Serine 431 are phosphorylated, KaiB binds to KaiC and this complex, KaiBC, then proceeds to block the effect of KaiA. KaiB can only perform this sequestering action when KaiA is present, and when this action occurs, KaiA cannot then activate KaiC to autophosphorylate. Threonine 432 is dephosphorylated first, followed by the dephosphorylation of Serine 431, at which point KaiA stimulates phosphorylation of the KaiC sites, and the oscillating system starts anew.

=== ATPase oscillation ===
This circadian oscillation involving the kinase and phosphatase activity occurs in direct relation to ATPase activity. In the initial phases of the oscillation when KaiC does not complex with either KaiA or KaiB, the intrinsic, constant rate of ATP hydrolysis controls ATP levels. KaiA and KaiC bind, forming the KaiAC complex, which stimulates KaiC autophosphorylation. This resulting phosphorylation stimulates ATP hydrolysis. The KaiC protein then reaches a state of hyperphosphorylation, after this binding of KaiA. At this point of hyperphosphorylation, KaiB binds to KaiC, and an inhibition of ATP hydrolysis occurs. KaiC then returns to initial uncomplexed state, and the ATP hydrolysis rates once again stabilize to the intrinsic rate.

=== KaiA and KaiC interaction ===
The proteins differ in their C terminal domains, yet both termini facilitate interaction among the proteins. The C terminal domain of KaiA enables dimerization, forming a concave surface that then interacts with the KaiC C-terminal domain. These C-terminal domains neighbor a hairpin loop, or the A-loop, that together confer interest: when a mutation results in loss of both the A-tail and the C-terminal domain, the C-terminal can remain phosphorylated in the absence of KaiA, thus signaling that a possible function of the A-loop is to assist in the autophosphorylation and autodephosphorylation of KaiC.

KaiC has 2 C-terminal binding domains: CI region has the KaiA binding domain of CKABD1; CII region has the KaiA binding domain of CKABD2. The CII C-terminal domain of KaiC maintains kinase and phosphatase function that are regulated by kaiA. KaiA interacts with this domain which fashions an inhibitory loop, stimulating the CII kinase activity and initiating the phosphorylation of Ser431 and Thr432, two adjacent CII residues. KaiC and KaiA binding leads to the unraveling of KaiA into an A-loop, thus increasing the movement of the P-loop region, the loop region holding Thr-432 and Ser-431, and ATP. The displacement of the A-loop allows for the freeing of adjacent loops, further promoting the phosphorylation of KaiC by KaiA. Evidence of this is shown through the demonstration that one KaiA dimer is able to push KaiC to a hyperphosphorylated state. KaiA dimers exhibit a 95% association with KaiC hexamers, in which more kaiA dimers participate in interaction with kaiC. The interaction between KaiA and KaiC is thus not a 1:1 interaction. KaiA dimers likely flexibly associate and disassociate with KaiC dimers rather than forming a stable complex, thus allowing for all the KaiC subunits to be phosphorylated in the Kai phosphorylation cycle.

=== Complexing model ===
Biochemical imaging revealed the assembly and disassembly of various Kai complexes that form during circadian clock oscillations. During the process, KaiA and KaiB bind to sites on KaiC; the model determines that KaiC then becomes KaiAC when KaiA stimulates autophosphorylation, which then transforms into KaiBC, KaiABC, and then returns to KaiC as the cycle continues.

=== Hypothesized Models ===
“Cyanobacteria are the simplest organisms known to exhibit circadian rhythms .” The transcription-translation based oscillator, in other words TTO, is a proposed model that postulates KaiC negatively regulates KaiBC transcription and KaiA positively regulates kaiBC transcription. Kai proteins don’t regulate circadian regulated genes, but do regulate genome wide gene expression in the cyanobacterial TTO model. An example of this is the kaiBC operon. It is still unclear how the transcription-translation feedback loop maintains periodicity and how it is flexible to environmental changes. Since these proteins are essential for the organism to adapt to the environment, understanding the genes are imperative in circadian biology. In cyanobacterium Synechococcus elongates (PCC 7942) kaiA, kaiB, and kaiC are the necessary components that compose the circadian clock. The TTO model of cyanobacteria is questionable due to the finding that phosphorylation of KaiC oscillates regardless of transcription/translation of the kaiBC operon. Thus, it was postulated that the pacemaker is based upon kaiC phosphorylation rather than transcription/translation feedback loop. KaiA augments kaiC autophosphorylation. KaiA and ATP promote the phosphorylation of T432. KaiB mitigates the effect of kaiA. Thus, “autonomous oscillation of KaiC phosphorylation could be generated by cooperation between kaiA and kaiB."

== See also ==
- Bacterial circadian rhythms
- Circadian rhythm
- Chronobiology
- Cyanobacteria
- KaiC
- KaiB
- Oscillation
- Phosphorylation
- Synechococcus
