= Takao Kondo =

Japanese biologist (1948–2023)

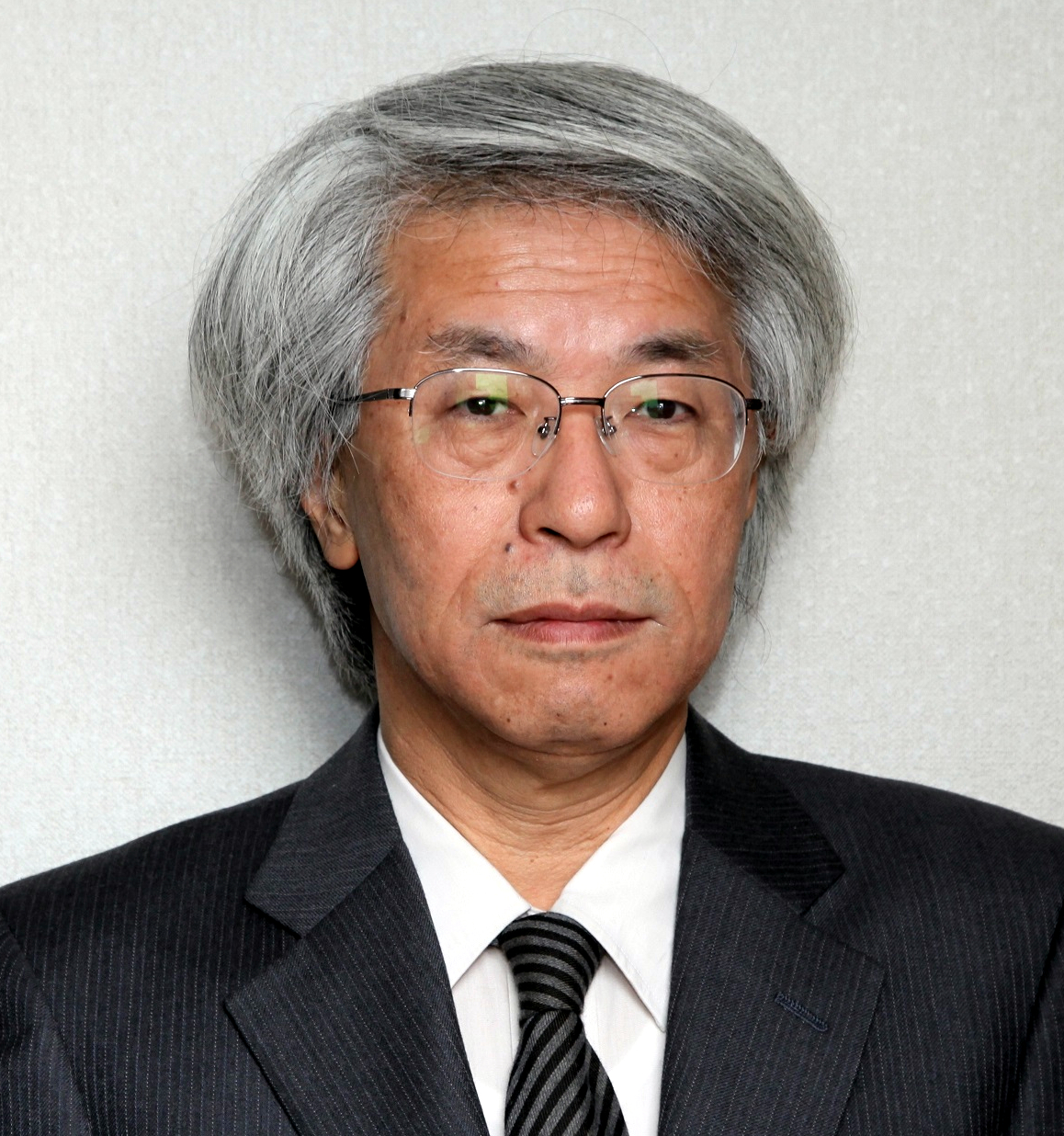
- Kondō in 2019
- Born: 1948; Kariya, Aichi, Japan
- Died: 16 November 2023 (aged 75)
- Education: Nagoya University
- Known for: Cyanobacterial clock proteins, kaiA, kaiC
- Awards: Japan Academy Prize (2014); Asahi Prize (2007)
- Scientific career
- Fields: Biology, Chronobiology
- Workplaces: Nagoya University; National Institute for Basic Biology

Takao Kondo (近藤 孝男, Kondō Takao; 1948 – 16 November 2023) was a Japanese biologist and professor of biological science at Nagoya University in Nagoya, Japan. He is best known for reconstituting the circadian clock in vitro.

== Biography ==
Kondo was born in 1948 in Kariya, Aichi, Japan, and received his B.S. in 1970 and his Ph.D. in Biology in 1977 from Nagoya University. He was appointed an assistant professor at the National Institute for Basic Biology in Okazaki, Aichi, Japan in 1978. Kondo began work as a visiting scholar at Harvard University in 1985, then continued his work abroad at Vanderbilt University between 1990 and 1991. It was at Vanderbilt University that Kondo began his research on the circadian clock of cyanobacteria. Kondo returned to Nagoya University as a professor at the Graduate School of Science in 1995. Kondo served as Dean of the School of Science from 2006 to 2009 and President of the Institute for Advanced Research of Nagoya University from 2007 to 2013. Kondo held the title of Designated Professor and Professor Emeritus of Nagoya University. Kondo died from pneumonia on 16 November 2023, at the age of 75.

== Research ==
Kondo was best known for his discoveries surrounding the molecular basis of the cyanobacteria circadian clock. Prior to Kondo's work in the late 1980s, controversy surrounding the existence of a biological clock in bacteria. Since bacteria divide rapidly and several times per day, it was thought that there was no necessity to evolve a biological clock in bacteria. Promoter-trap and microarray analysis performed by Kondo in the cyanobacteria Synechococcus revealed that many, if not all, genes displayed a rhythmic, circadian component to their expression. Kondo next employed a forward genetics approach and developed a luciferase reporter system to identify clock mutants in Synechococcus. Mutations that altered circadian behavior were grouped in a single region of the Synechococcus genome. From this observation, Kondo discovered the gene cluster kaiABC as a circadian feedback process in cyanobacteria in 1998. In 2002, Kondo demonstrated that kaiA-stimulated kaiC phosphorylation is necessary for circadian timing loops in cyanobacteria. In 2005, Kondo succeeded in reconstituting the circadian oscillation of cyanobacterial kaiC phosphorylation in vitro. Kondo's seminal 2005 discovery was the first example of a recapitulated biological rhythm in a test tube, mimicked rhythms observed in eukaryotic cells, and disproved the universal necessity of the transcription-translation autoregulatory feedback loop. Kondo's characterization of kaiABC behavior provided a molecular mechanism by which proteins respond to changes in time and enabled the fields of bacterial genetics and quantitative biochemistry to aid investigation of the biological clock.

== Honors ==
- 1980: American Society for Plant Physiologist
- 1990–20??: Society of Research on Biological Rhythms
- 1995: Aschoff-Homna Prize
- 1999: Kihara Memorial Foundation Academic Award
- 1999-2005: Secretary-general, Japanese Society for Chronobiology
- 2005: Chunichi Prize
- 2006: Japanese Society of Botany Prize
- 2007: Asahi Prize
- 2007: Japanese Society for the Promotion of Science Prize
- 2011: Kihara Prize
- 2011: Medal with Purple Ribbon
- 2011–20??: President, Japanese Society for Chronobiology
- 2014: Japan Academy Prize
- 2015: Gilbert Morgan Smith Medal
- 2019: Person of Cultural Merit
