= KaiC =

Gene found in cyanobacteria

kaiC
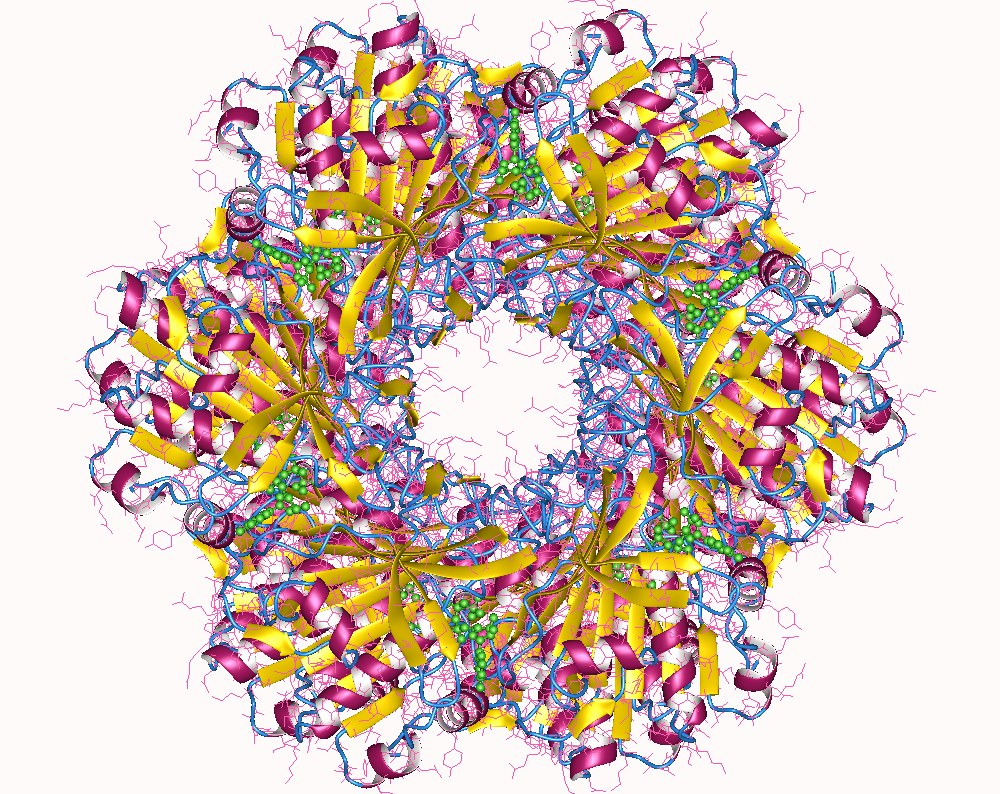
- 1TF7

Identifiers
- Organism: Synechococcus elongatus
- Symbol: kaiC
- Entrez: 3773504
- RefSeq (Prot): YP_400233.1
- UniProt: Q79PF4
Search for
- Structures: Swiss-model
- Domains: InterPro

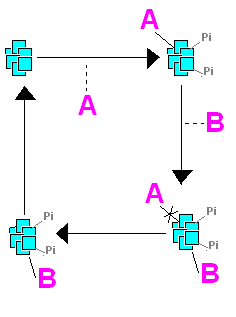
Circadian autophosphorylation of kaiC protein by kaiA and kaiB

KaiC is a gene belonging to the KaiABC gene cluster (with KaiA, and KaiB) that, together, regulate bacterial circadian rhythms, specifically in cyanobacteria. KaiC encodes the KaiC protein, which interacts with the KaiA and KaiB proteins in a post-translational oscillator (PTO). The PTO is cyanobacteria master clock that is controlled by sequences of phosphorylation of KaiC protein. Regulation of KaiABC expression and KaiABC phosphorylation is essential for cyanobacteria circadian rhythmicity, and is particularly important for regulating cyanobacteria processes such as nitrogen fixation, photosynthesis, and cell division. Studies have shown similarities to Drosophila, Neurospora, and mammalian clock models in that the kaiABC regulation of the cyanobacteria slave circadian clock is also based on a transcription translation feedback loop (TTFL). KaiC protein has both auto-kinase and auto-phosphatase activity and functions as the circadian regulator in both the PTO and the TTFL. KaiC has been found to not only suppress kaiBC when overexpressed, but also suppress circadian expression of all genes in the cyanobacterial genome.

== Evolutionary History ==
Though the KaiABC gene cluster has been found to exist only in cyanobacteria, evolutionarily KaiC contains homologs that occur in Archaea and Pseudomonadota. It is the oldest circadian gene that has been discovered in prokaryotes. KaiC has a double-domain structure and sequence that classifies it as part of the RecA gene family of ATP-dependent recombinases. Based on a number of single-domain homologous genes in other species, KaiC is hypothesized to have horizontally transferred from Bacteria to Archaea, eventually forming the double-domain KaiC through duplication and fusion. KaiC's key role in circadian control and homology to RecA suggest its individual evolution before its presence in the KaiABC gene cluster.

== Discovery ==
Masahiro Ishiura, Takao Kondo, Susan S. Golden, Carl H. Johnson, and their colleagues discovered the gene cluster in 1998 and named the gene cluster kaiABC, as "kai" means "cycle" in Japanese. They generated 19 different clock mutants that were mapped to kaiA, kaiB, and kaiC genes, and successfully cloned the gene cluster in the cyanobacteria Synechococcus elongatus. Using a bacterial luciferase reporter to monitor the expression of clock-controlled gene psbAI in Synechococcus, they investigated and reported on the rescue to normal rhythmicity of long-period clock mutant C44a (with a period of 44 hours) by kaiABC. They inserted wild-type DNA through a pNIBB7942 plasmid vector into the C44a mutant, and generated clones that restored normal period (a period of 25 hours). They were eventually able to localize the gene region causing this rescue, and observed circadian rhythmicity in upstream promotor activity of kaiA and kaiB, as well as in the expression of kaiA and kaiBC messenger RNA. They determined abolishing any of the three kai genes would cause arrhythmicity in the circadian clock and reduce kaiBC promoter activity. KaiC was later found to have both autokinase and autophosphatase activity. These findings suggested that circadian rhythm was controlled by a TTFL mechanism, which is consistent with other known biological clocks.

In 2000, S. elongatus was observed in constant dark (DD) and constant light (LL). In DD, transcription and translation halted due to the absence of light but the circadian mechanism showed no significant phase shift after transitioning to constant light. In 2005, after closer examination of the KaiABC protein interactions, the phosphorylation of KaiC proved to oscillate with daily rhythms in the absence of light. In addition to the TTFL model, the PTO model was hypothesized for the KaiABC phosphorylation cycle.

Also in 2005, Nakajima et al. lysed S. elongatus and isolated KaiABC proteins. In test tubes containing only KaiABC proteins and ATP, in vitro phosphorylation of KaiC oscillated with a near 24 hour period with a slightly smaller amplitude than in vivo oscillation, proving that the KaiABC proteins are sufficient for circadian rhythm solely in the presence of ATP. Combined with the TTFL model, KaiABC as a circadian PTO was shown to be the fundamental clock regulator in S. elongatus

== Genetics and protein structure ==
On Synechococcus elongatus' singular circular chromosome, the protein-coding gene kaiC is located at position 380696-382255 (its locus tag is syc0334_d). The gene kaiC has paralogs kaiB (located 380338..380646) and kaiA (located 379394..380248). kaiC encodes the protein KaiC (519 amino acids). KaiC acts as a non-specific transcription regulator that represses transcription of the kaiBC promoter. Its crystal structure has been solved at 2.8 Å resolution; it is a homohexameric complex (approximately 360 kDa) with a double-doughnut structure and a central pore which is open at the N-terminal ends and partially sealed at the C-terminal ends due to the presence of six arginine residues. The hexamer has twelve ATP molecules between the N- (CI) and C-terminal (CII) domains, which demonstrate ATPase activity. The CI and CII domains are linked by the N-terminal region of the CII domain. The last 20 residues from the C-terminal of the CII domain protrude from the doughnut to form what is called the A-loop. Interfaces on KaiC's CII domain are sites for both auto-kinase and auto-phosphatase activity, both in vitro and in vivo. KaiC has two P loops or Walker's motif As (ATP-/GTP-binding motifs) in the CI and CII domains; the CI domain also contains two DXXG (X represents any amino acid) motifs that are highly conserved among the GTPase super-family.

=== Evolutionary relationships ===
KaiC shares structural similarities to several other proteins with hexameric rings, including RecA, DnaB and ATPases. The hexameric rings of KaiC closely resembles RecA, with 8 α-helices surrounding a twisted β-sheet made up of 7 strands. This structure favours the binding of a nucleotide at the carboxy-end of the β-sheet. KaiC's structural similarities to these proteins suggests a role for KaiC in transcription regulation. Further, the diameter of the rings in KaiC are suitable to accommodate single stranded DNA. Additionally, the surface potential at the CII ring and the C-terminal channel opening is mostly positive. The compatibility of the diameter as well as the surface potential charge suggests that DNA may be able to bind to the C-terminal channel opening.

== Mechanism ==
=== Regulation of KaiC ===
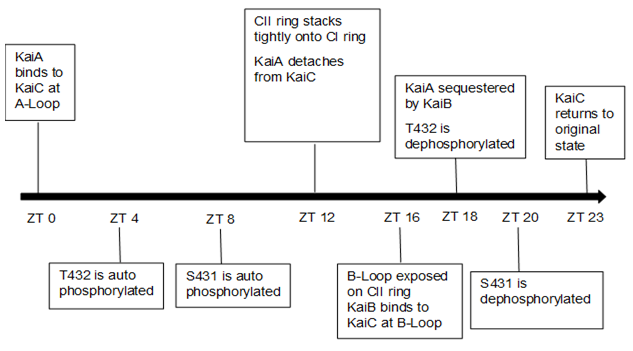
KaiC autokinase and autophosphatase activities in a 24hr cycle

Kai proteins regulate genome-wide gene expression. Protein KaiA enhances the phosphorylation of protein KaiC by binding to the A loop of the CII domain to promote auto-kinase activity during subjective day. Phosphorylation at subunits occurs in an ordered manner, beginning with phosphorylation of Threonine 432 (T432) followed by Serine 431 (S431) on the CII domain. This leads to tight stacking of the CII domain to the CI domain. KaiB then binds to the exposed B loop on the CII domain of KaiC and sequesters KaiA from the C-terminals during subjective night, which inhibits phosphorylation and stimulates auto-phosphatase activity. Dephosphorylation of T432 occurs followed by S431, returning KaiC to its original state.

Disruption of KaiC's CI domain results both in arrhythmia of kaiBC expression and a reduction of ATP-binding activity; this, along with in vitro autophosphorylation of KaiC indicate that ATP binding to KaiC is crucial for Synechococcus circadian oscillation. The phosphorylation status of KaiC has been correlated with Synechococcus clock speed in vivo. Additionally, overexpression of KaiC has been shown to strongly repress the kaiBC promoter, while kaiA overexpression has experimentally enhanced the kaiBC promoter. These positive and negative binding elements mirror a feedback mechanism of rhythm generation conserved across many different species.

KaiC phosphorylation oscillates with a period of approximately 24 hours when placed in vitro with the three recombinant Kai proteins, incubated with ATP. The circadian rhythm of KaiC phosphorylation persists in constant darkness, regardless of Synechococcus transcription rates. This oscillation rate is thought to be controlled by the ratio of phosphorylated to unphosphorylated KaiC protein. KaiC phosphorylation ratio is a main factor in the activation of kaiBC promoter as well. The kaiBC operon is transcribed in a circadian fashion and precedes KaiC build up by about 6 hours, a lag thought to play a role in feedback loops.

=== Interdependence of Kai A, B, and C ===
kaiA, kaiB, and kaiC have been shown to be essential genetic components in Synechococcus elongatus for circadian rhythms. Experiments have also shown that KaiC enhances the KaiA-KaiB interaction in yeast cells and in vitro. This implies that there may be the formation of a heteromultimeric complex composed of the three Kai proteins with KaiC serving as a bridge between KaiA and KaiB. Alternatively, KaiC may form a heterodimer with KaiA or KaiB to induce a conformational change. Variations in the C-terminal region of each of their proteins suggest functional divergence between the Kai clock proteins, however there are critical interdependencies between the three paralogs.

== Function ==
Cyanobacteria are the simplest organisms with a known mechanism for the generation of circadian rhythms. KaiC ATPase activity is temperature compensated from 25 to 50 degrees Celsius and has a Q10 of about 1.1 (Q10 values around 1 indicate temperature compensation). Because the period of KaiC phosphorylation is temperature compensated and agrees with in vivo circadian rhythms, KaiC is thought to be the mechanism for basic circadian timing in Synechococcus. ∆kaiABC individuals, one of the more common mutants, grow just as well as wild type individuals but they lack rhythmicity. This is evidence that the kaiABC gene cluster is not necessary for growth.

=== KaiC's role in the TTFL ===
In addition to the PTO regulating the autokinase and autophosphatase activities of KaiC, there is also evidence for a TTFL, similar to other eukaryotes, that governs the circadian rhythm in outputs of the clock. By studying the structure and the activities of KaiC, several roles of KaiC in the TTFL were suggested. The similar structures of KaiC to the RecA/DnaB superfamily suggested a possible role for KaiC in direct DNA binding and promoting of transcription. KaiC knock-out(KO) experiments determined KaiC to be a negative regulator of the kaiBC promoter sequence but it was found working through a separate, SasA/RpaA pathway, as KaiC was found to be not a transcription factor. However, elimination of the PTO did not fully eliminate the rhythmicity in kaiBC promoter activities, suggesting that the PTO is not necessary in generating rhythms in the TTFL. In truth, the activities of KaiC outside of the PTO is still relatively unknown.

=== Circadian Regulation of Cell Division ===
Recent experiments have found that the oscillations in the cell cycle and circadian rhythms of Synechococcus are linked together through a one way mechanism. The circadian clock gates cells division, only allowing it to proceed at certain phases. The cell cycle does not appear to have any effect on the circadian clock, though. When binary fission occurs, the daughter cells inherit the mother cell's circadian clock and are in phase with the mother cell. The circadian gating of cell division may be a protective feature to prevent division at a vulnerable phase. Phases in which KaiC has high ATPase activity do not allow for cell division to take place. In mutants with constantly elevated KaiC ATPase activity, the protein CikA is absent. CikA is a major factor in the input pathway and causes KaiC-dependent cell elongation.

== Notable research ==
The recreation of a circadian oscillator in vitro in the presence of only KaiA, KaiB, KaiC, and ATP has sparked interest in the relationship between cellular biochemical oscillators and their associated transcription-translation feedback loops (TTFLs). TTFLs have long been assumed to be the core of circadian rhythmicity, but that claim is now being tested again due to the possibility that the biochemical oscillators could constitute the central mechanism of the clock system, regulating and operating within TTFLs that control output and restore proteins essential to the oscillators in organisms, such as the KaiABC system in Synechococcus. Two models have been proposed to describe the relationship between the biochemical and TTFL regulation of circadian rhythms: a master/slave oscillator system with the TTFL oscillator synchronizing to the biochemical oscillator and an equally weighted coupled oscillator system in which both oscillators synchronize and influence the other oscillator. Both are coupled oscillator models that account for the high stability of the timing mechanism within Synechococcus. The biochemical oscillator relies on redundant molecular interactions based on the law of mass action, whereas the TTFL relies on cellular machinery that mediates translation, transcription, and degradation of mRNA and proteins. The different types of interactions driving the two oscillators allows the circadian clock to be resilient to changes within the cell, such as metabolic fluctuation, temperature changes, and cell division.

Though the period of the circadian clock is temperature compensated, the phosphorylation of KaiC can be stably entrained to a temperature cycle. The phosphorylation of KaiC was successfully entrained in vitro to temperature cycles with periods between 20 and 28 hours using temperature steps from 30 °C to 45 °C and vice versa. The results reflect a phase-dependent shift in the phase of the KaiC phosphorylation rhythms. The period of the circadian clock was not changed, reinforcing the temperature compensation of the clock mechanism.

A 2012 study out of Vanderbilt University shows evidence that KaiC acts as a phospho-transferase that hands back phosphates to ADP on the T432 (threonine residue at position 432) and S431 (serine residue 431) indicating that KaiC effectively serves as an ATP synthase.

Various KaiC mutants have been identified and their phenotypes studied. Many mutants show a change in the period of their circadian rhythms.

Mutation	Period
Wild	24.8 Hours
E318A	Arrhythmic
E318D	Arrhythmic
R385A	36-48 Hours
D417A	25.6 Hours
H429A	28.0 Hours
I430A	Arrhythmic
F470Y	17 Hours
S157P	21 Hours
T42S	28 Hours

== See also ==
- Bacterial circadian rhythms
- Circadian rhythm
- Chronobiology
- Cyanobacteria
- KaiA
- KaiB
- Oscillation
- Phosphorylation
- Synechococcus
