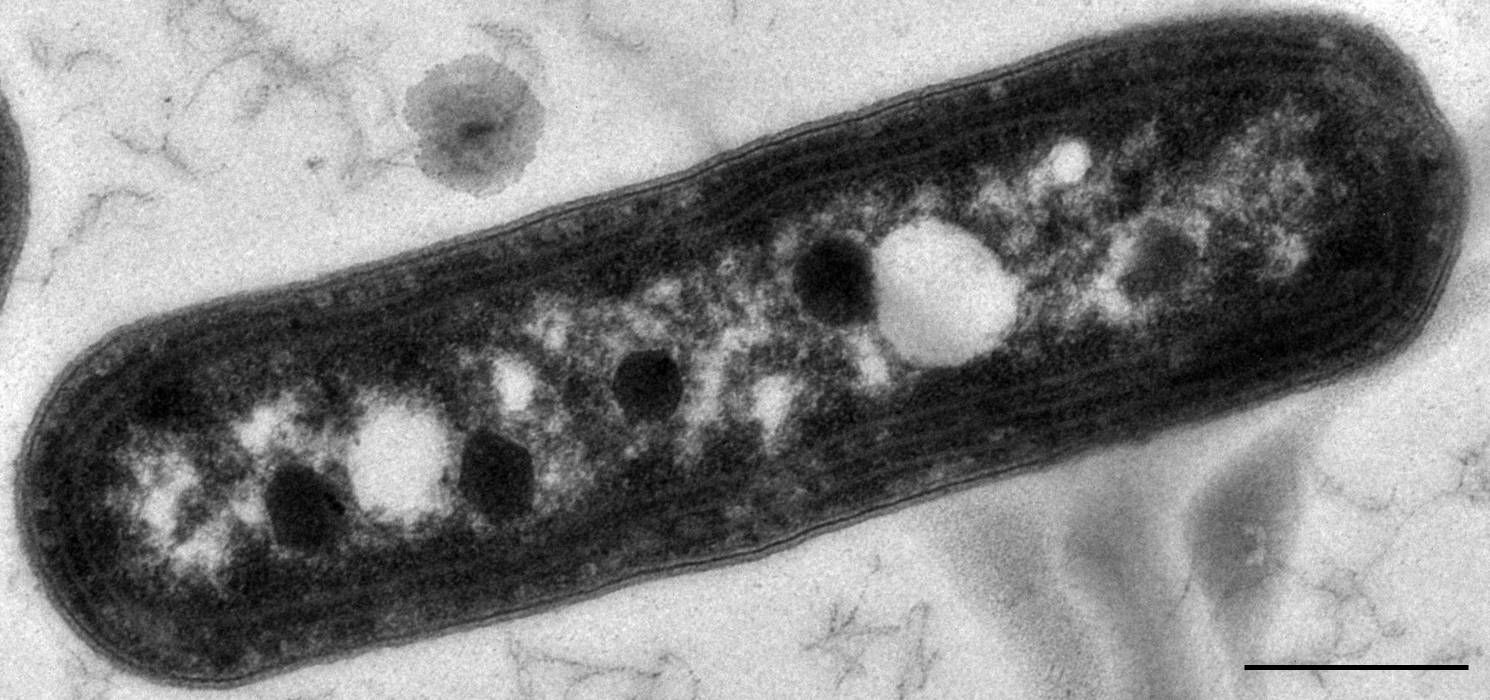

Scientific classification
- Domain: Bacteria
- Kingdom: Bacillati
- Phylum: Cyanobacteriota
- Class: Cyanophyceae
- Order: Synechococcales
- Family: Synechococcaceae
- Genus: Synechococcus
- Species: S. elongatus

Binomial name
- Synechococcus elongatus (Nägeli) Nägeli

= Synechococcus elongatus =

Species of bacterium

Synechococcus elongatus is a unicellular cyanobacterium that has a rapid autotrophic growth comparable to yeast. Its ability to grow rapidly using sunlight has implications for biotechnological applications, especially when incorporating genetic modification.

== Occurrence ==
In the last decade, several strains of Synechococcus elongatus have been produced in laboratory environments, which ultimately led to the production of Synechococcus elongatus UTEX 2973. S. elongatus UTEX 2973 is a mutant hybrid from UTEX 625.

In 1955, William A. Kratz and Jack Myers described a fast-growing cyanobacterial strain, Anacystis nidulans which was deposited in the University of Texas algae culture collection as Synechococcus leopoliensis UTEX 625 However, that strain had lost its rapid growth property and was also unable to grow at high temperatures, unlike the original strain. In 2015, Jingjie Yu and colleagues, were able to isolate the mutant strain from a mixed culture of Synechococcus UTEX 625. The mutant strain was deposited to the UTEX algae culture collection, and given a new number, UTEX 2979.

== Structure ==
Synechococcus elongatus is rod-shaped with its cells typically greater than 2 μm in length. It typically contains 2–3 thylakoid membrane layers forming evenly spaced concentric rings and its carboxysomes and polyphosphate bodies are located in the central cytoplasmic region (Image 1).

== Genetics ==
The genome sequence of Synechococcus UTEX 2973 was similar to the cyanobacterium Synechococcus PCC 7942. Even though it was isolated from S. elongatus 625, it is most closely related to S. elongatus PCC 7942 with 99.8% similarity. S. elongatus UTEX 2973 contains a SNP to the gene encoding ATP synthase F_{1} subunit α, comparable to the corresponding gene in Synechococcus PCC 7942. This specific SNP causes an amino acid substitution at the 252nd position of the protein.

== Metabolism ==
Synechococcus elongatus UTEX 2973 is photoautotrophic and has one of the shortest doubling times reported for cyanobacteria at 1.5 hours in a BG11 medium at 42 °C under continuous 1,500 μmoles photons·m−2·s−1 white light with 5% CO_{2}. While it is typically maintained on BG11 media, it can also be cryopreserved using 1% (v/v) dimethyl sulfoxide (DMSO) as a cryoprotectant.

== Significance ==
Ungerer and colleagues, 2018, used CRISPR/Cpf1, to perform a mutational analysis of S. elongatus UTEX 2973 by identifying the three genes with SNPs associated with rapid growth, atpA, ppnK, and rpaA. They replaced the wild-type alleles in Synechococcus 7942 with the rapid growth associated alleles from S. elongatus UTEX 2973. This resulted in Synechococcus 7942 reducing its doubling time from 6.8 to 2.3 hours.

Also modified strains of S. elongatus have high prospects in production of 2,3-butanediol and other substances, which can be used in plastic and fuel production.

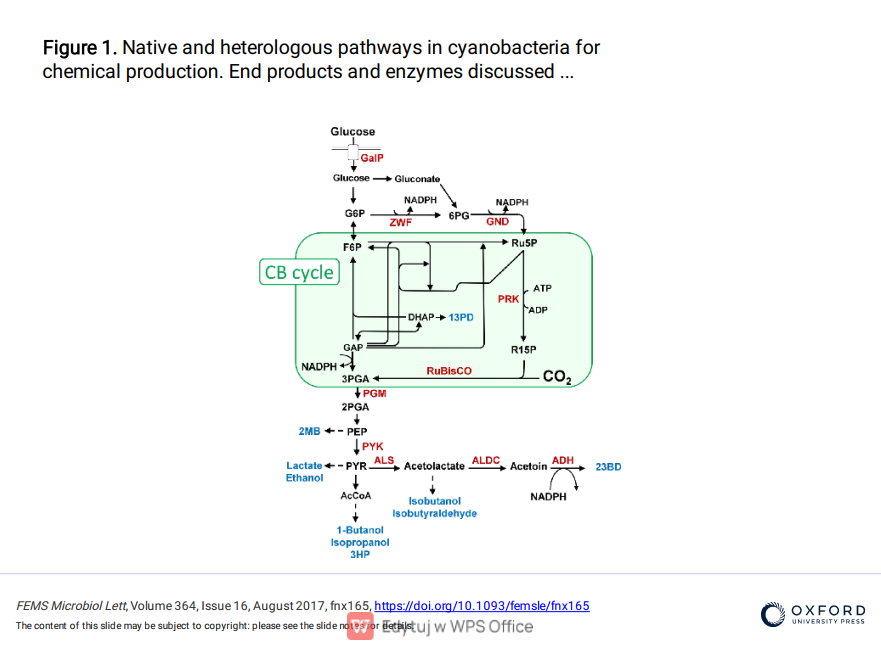
S. elongatus
