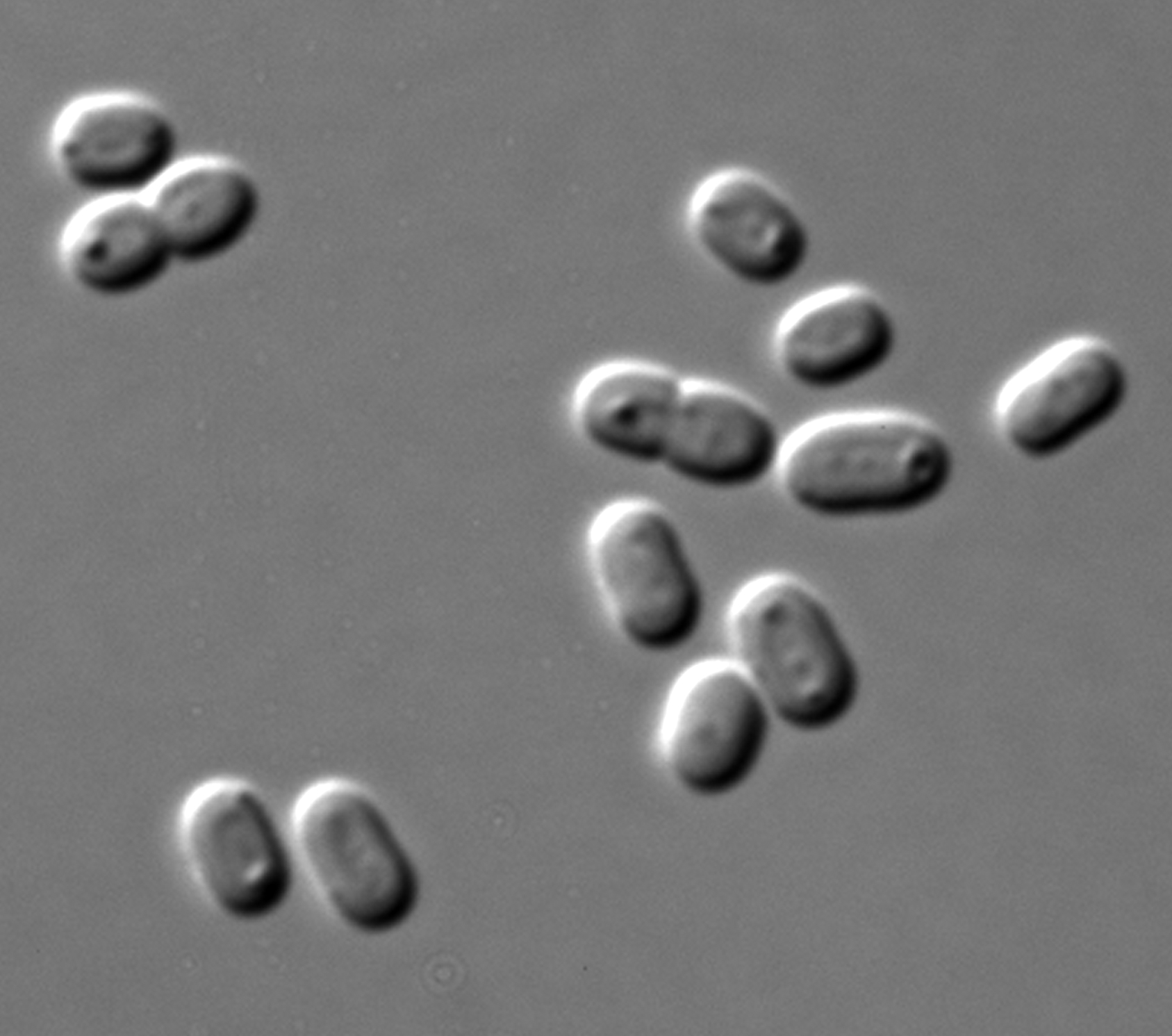
- Synechococcus PCC 7002 cells in DIC microscopy

Scientific classification
- Domain: Bacteria
- Kingdom: Bacillati
- Phylum: Cyanobacteriota
- Class: Cyanophyceae
- Order: Synechococcales
- Family: Synechococcaceae
- Genus: Synechococcus; Nägeli, 1849

Species
- See text

= Synechococcus =

Genus of bacteria

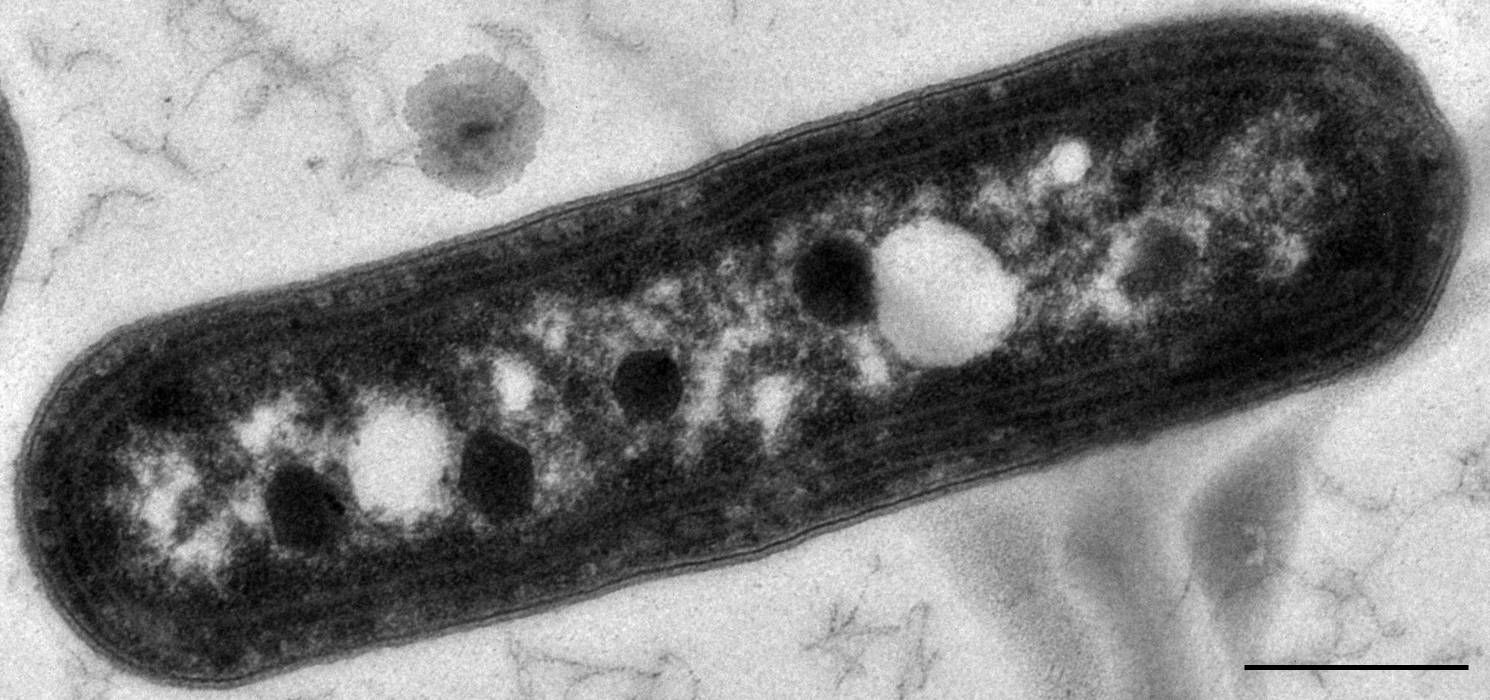
Transmission electron micrograph showing a species of the cyanobacteria Synechococcus. The carboxysomes appear as polyhedral dark structures.

Synechococcus (from the Greek synechos, in succession, and the Greek kokkos, granule) is a unicellular cyanobacterium that is very widespread in the marine environment. Its size varies from 0.8 to 1.5 μm. The photosynthetic coccoid cells are preferentially found in well–lit surface waters where it can be very abundant (generally 1,000 to 200,000 cells per ml). Many freshwater species of Synechococcus have also been described.

The genome of S. elongatus strain PCC7002 has a size of 3.4 Mbp, whereas the oceanic strain WH8102 has a genome of size 2.4 Mbp.

== Introduction ==
Synechococcus is one of the most important components of the prokaryotic autotrophic picoplankton in the temperate to tropical oceans. The genus was first described in 1979, and was originally defined to include "small unicellular cyanobacteria with ovoid to cylindrical cells that reproduce by binary traverse fission in a single plane and lack sheaths". This definition of the genus Synechococcus contained organisms of considerable genetic diversity and was later subdivided into subgroups based on the presence of the accessory pigment phycoerythrin. The marine forms of Synechococcus are coccoid cells between 0.6 and 1.6 μm in size. They are Gram-negative cells with highly structured cell walls that may contain projections on their surface. Electron microscopy frequently reveals the presence of phosphate inclusions, glycogen granules, and more importantly, highly structured carboxysomes.

Cells are known to be motile by a gliding method and a novel uncharacterized, nonphototactic swimming method that does not involve flagellar motion. While some cyanobacteria are capable of photoheterotrophic or even chemoheterotrophic growth, all marine Synechococcus strains appear to be obligate photoautotrophs that are capable of supporting their nitrogen requirements using nitrate, ammonia, or in some cases urea as a sole nitrogen source. Marine Synechococcus species are traditionally not thought to fix nitrogen.

In the last decade, several strains of Synechococcus elongatus have been produced in laboratory environments to include the fastest growing cyanobacteria to date, Synechococcus elongatus UTEX 2973. S. elongatus UTEX 2973 is a mutant hybrid from UTEX 625 and is most closely related to S. elongatus PCC 7942 with 99.8% similarity. It has the shortest doubling time at “1.9 hours in a BG11 medium at 41°C under continuous 500 μmoles photons·m−2·s−1 white light with 3% CO2”.

== Pigments ==
The main photosynthetic pigment in Synechococcus is chlorophyll a, while its major accessory pigments are phycobiliprotein. The four commonly recognized phycobilins are phycocyanin, allophycocyanin, allophycocyanin B and phycoerythrin. In addition Synechococcus also contains zeaxanthin but no diagnostic pigment for this organism is known. Zeaxanthin is also found in Prochlorococcus, red algae and as a minor pigment in some chlorophytes and eustigmatophytes. Similarly, phycoerythrin is also found in rhodophytes and some cryptomonads.

== Phylogeny ==
Much like other cyanobacterial taxa, the taxonomic description of Synechococcus was originally based on morphology alone. It was greatly reshaped, repeatedly, with the advance of DNA-based methods, to better reflect what new information indicates is the likely phylogeny of these bacteria.

GC content data for many strains became available in the 1980s. It was found that so-called Synechococcus had a GC content ranging from 39 to 71%, an indicator of large genetic diversity. Accordingly, attempts were made to divide the group into three subclusters, each with a specific range of genomic G+C content. The observation that open-ocean isolates alone nearly span the complete G+C spectrum, however, indicates that Synechococcus is composed of at least several species.

Bergey's Manual of 2001 now divides Synechococcus into five clusters (equivalent to genera) based on morphology, physiology, and genetic traits.

- Cluster 1 includes relatively large (1–1.5 μm) nonmotile obligate photoautotrophs that exhibit low salt tolerance. Reference strains for this cluster are PCC6301 (formerly Anacycstis nidulans) and PCC6312, which were isolated from fresh water in Texas and California, respectively.
- Cluster 2 also is characterized by low salt tolerance. Cells are obligate photoautrotrophs, lack phycoerythrin, and are thermophilic. The reference strain PCC6715 was isolated from a hot spring in Yellowstone National Park.
- Cluster 3 includes phycoerythrin-lacking marine Synechococcus species that are euryhaline, i.e. capable of growth in both marine and freshwater environments. Several strains, including the reference strain PCC7003, are facultative heterotrophs and require vitamin B_{12} for growth.
- Cluster 4 contains a single isolate, PCC7335. This strain is obligate marine. This strain contains phycoerythrin and was first isolated from the intertidal zone in Puerto Peñasco, Mexico.
- The last cluster contains what had previously been referred to as ‘marine A and B clusters’ of Synechococcus. These cells are truly marine and have been isolated from both the coastal and the open ocean. All strains are obligate photoautrophs and are around 0.6–1.7 μm in diameter. This cluster is, however, further divided into a population that either contains (cluster 5.1) or does not contain (cluster 5.2) phycoerythrin. The reference strains are WH8103 for the phycoerythrin-containing strains and WH5701 for those strains that lack this pigment.

More recently, Badger et al. (2002) proposed the division of the cyanobacteria into a α- and a β-subcluster based on the type of rbcL (large subunit of ribulose 1,5-bisphosphate carboxylase/oxygenase) found in these organisms. α-cyanobacteria were defined to contain a form IA, while β-cyanobacteria were defined to contain a form IB of this gene. In support for this division Badger et al. analyze the phylogeny of carboxysomal proteins, which appear to support this division. Also, two particular bicarbonate transport systems appear to only be found in α-cyanobacteria, which lack carboxysomal carbonic anhydrases.

A complete phylogenetic tree of 16S rRNA sequences of Synechococcus-shaped bacteria was produced in 2014. It revealed at least 12 groups, which morphologically correspond to Synechococcus, but they have not derived from the common ancestor. Moreover, it has been estimated based on molecular dating that the first Synechococcus lineage has appeared 3 billion years ago in thermal springs with subsequent radiation to marine and freshwater environments.

=== Taxonomy ===
==== Accepted framework ====
Komárek et al. (2020) uses a combination of phylogenomics and 16S rRNA to divide the Synechococcus-shaped bacteria into a number of genera, families, and orders. Some of these are newly created (marked with "nov."):

- Thermostichales ord. nov.: Thermostichaceae fam. nov. (Thermostichus gen. nov.: type Tst. vulcanus = S. vulcanus).
- Synechococcales: Prochlorococcaceae fam. nov.
- Pseudanabaenales: Thermosynechococcaceae fam. nov. (Thermosynechococcus gen. nov.: type Tsc. vestitus = S. elongatus var. vestitus = "Tsc. elongatus")
- Chroococcales: Aphanothecaceae (Picosynechococcus gen. nov.: type Psc. fontinalis)

All of these above names are validly published under the provivisions of the Botanical Code. They are accepted by AlgaeBase and LPSN.

Strunecký, Otakar, and Mareš (2023) revised the classification of cyanobacteria, including those traditionally called "Synechococcus", at the order and family levels. The work combines a phylogenomic tree with a 16S ribosomal tree. This forms the currently-accepted backbone of taxonomy.

==== GTDB framework ====
Salazar et al. (2020) split the Synechococcus-shaped bacteria into 15 genera under 5 different orders using phylogenomics, specifically the methods of GTDB:

- Synechococcales: Cyanobiaceae fam. nov. (Cyanobium, Inmanicoccus, Lacustricoccus gen. nov., Parasynechococcus, Pseudosynechococcus, Regnicoccus, Synechospongium gen. nov., and Vulcanococcus) and Synechococcaceae (Synechococcus);
- Cyanobacteriales ord. nov.: Limnotrichaceae fam. nov. ("Limnothrix", which is not correctly represented in GTDB due to a lack of type species genome, but more properly Picosynechococcus);
- Leptococcales ord. nov.: Brevicoccaceae (Brevicoccus) and Leptococcaceae (Leptococcus);
- Thermosynechococcales ord. nov.: Thermosynechococcaceae fam. nov. (Stenotopis and Thermosynechococcus); and
- Neosynechococcales ord. nov.: Neosynechococcaceae fam. nov. (Neosynechococcus).

The GTDB framework is not accepted as legitimate by LPSN and AlgaeBase because the authors have neglected to validly publish the new taxa by providing explicit, individual descriptions for them. It is possible to map the GTDB names to the accepted framework of 2023 by comparing the phylogenetic trees used in the two works, made easier by the fact that the trees do assemble each other due to both being based on phylogenomics (most synonymy from LPSN):

Due to the GTDB and the 2020s accepted frameworks now agreeing on using:

Salazar 2020/GTDB	Strunecký 2023
Synechococcales	Synechococcales
Synechococcaceae	Synechococcaceae
Cyanobiaceae	Prochlorococcaceae
Cyanobacteriales	Chroococales + many more orders
Limnotrichaceae	Geminocystaceae pro parte
Leptococcales	(Not included)
Thermosynechococcales	Acaryochloridales
Thermosynechococcaceae	Thermosynechococcaceae
Neosynechococcales	Leptolyngbyales pro parte
Neosynechococcaceae	Neosynechococcaceae

== Ecology and distribution ==
Synechococcus has been observed to occur at concentrations ranging between a few cells to 10^{6} cells per ml in virtually all regions of oceanic euphotic zone except in samples from the McMurdo Sound and Ross Ice Shelf in Antarctica. Cells are generally much more abundant in nutrient-rich environments than in the oligotrophic ocean and prefer the upper, well-lit portion of the euphotic zone. Synechococcus has also been observed to occur at high abundances in environments with low salinities and/or low temperatures. It is usually far outnumbered by Prochlorococcus in all environments where they co-occur. Exceptions to this rule are areas of permanently enriched nutrients such as upwelling areas and coastal watersheds. In the nutrient-depleted areas of the oceans, such as the central gyres, Synechococcus is apparently always present, although only at low concentrations, ranging from a few to 4×10³ cells per ml. Vertically Synechococcus is usually relatively equitably distributed throughout the mixed layer and exhibits an affinity for the higher-light areas. Below the mixed layer, cell concentrations rapidly decline. Vertical profiles are strongly influenced by hydrologic conditions and can be very variable both seasonally and spatially. Overall, Synechococcus abundance often parallels that of Prochlorococcus in the water column. In the Pacific high-nutrient, low-chlorophyll zone and in temperate open seas where stratification was recently established both profiles parallel each other and exhibit abundance maxima just about the subsurface chlorophyll maximum.

The factors controlling the abundance of Synechococcus still remain poorly understood, especially considering that even in the most nutrient-depleted regions of the central gyres, where cell abundances are often very low, population growth rates are often high and not drastically limited. Factors such as grazing, viral mortality, genetic variability, light adaptation, and temperature, as well as nutrients are certainly involved, but remain to be investigated on a rigorous and global scale. Despite the uncertainties, a relationship probably exists between ambient nitrogen concentrations and Synechococcus abundance, with an inverse relationship to Prochlorococcus in the upper euphotic zone, where light is not limiting. One environment where Synechococcus thrives particularly well is coastal plumes of major rivers. Such plumes are coastally enriched with nutrients such as nitrate and phosphate, which drives large phytoplankton blooms. High productivity in coastal river plumes is often associated with large populations of Synechococcus and elevated form IA (cyanobacterial) rbcL mRNA.

Prochlorococcus is thought to be at least 100 times more abundant than Synechococcus in warm oligotrophic waters. Assuming average cellular carbon concentrations, it has thus been estimated that Prochlorococcus accounts for at least 22 times more carbon in these waters, thus may be of much greater significance to the global carbon cycle than Synechococcus.

== DNA recombination, repair and replication ==
Marine Synechococcus species possess a set of genes that function in DNA recombination, repair and replication. This set of genes includes the recBCD gene complex whose product, exonuclease V, functions in recombinational repair of DNA, and the umuCD gene complex whose product, DNA polymerase V, functions in error-prone DNA replication. Some Synechococcus strains are naturally competent for genetic transformation, and thus can take up extracellular DNA and recombine it into their own genome. Synechococcus strains also encode the gene lexA that regulates an SOS response system, that is likely similar to the well-studied E. coli SOS system that is employed in the response to DNA damage.

== Species ==
- Synechococcus ambiguus Skuja
- Synechococcus arcuatus var. calcicolus Fjerdingstad
- Synechococcus bigranulatus Skuja
- Synechococcus brunneolus Rabenhorst
- Synechococcus caldarius Okada
- Synechococcus capitatus A. E. Bailey-Watts & J. Komárek
- Synechococcus carcerarius Norris
- Synechococcus elongatus (Nägeli) Nägeli
- Synechococcus endogloeicus F. Hindák
- Synechococcus epigloeicus F. Hindák
- Synechococcus ferrunginosus Wawrik
- Synechococcus intermedius Gardner
- Synechococcus koidzumii Yoneda
- Synechococcus lividus Copeland
- Synechococcus marinus Jao
- Synechococcus minutissimus Negoro
- Synechococcus mundulus Skuja
- Synechococcus nidulans (Pringsheim) Komárek
- Synechococcus rayssae Dor
- Synechococcus rhodobaktron Komárek & Anagnostidis
- Synechococcus roseo-persicinus Grunow
- Synechococcus roseo-purpureus G. S. West
- Synechococcus salinarum Komárek
- Synechococcus salinus Frémy
- Synechococcus sciophilus Skuja
- Synechococcus sigmoideus (Moore & Carter) Komárek
- Synechococcus spongiarum Usher et al.
- Synechococcus subsalsus Skuja
- Synechococcus sulphuricus Dor
- Synechococcus vantieghemii (Pringsheim) Bourrelly
- Synechococcus violaceus Grunow
- Synechococcus viridissimus Copeland
- Synechococcus vulcanus Copeland

== See also ==
- Gloeomargarita lithophora
- Photosynthetic picoplankton
- Prochlorococcus
- Synechocystis, another cyanobacterial model organism
