= Andrew Millar (biologist) =

Andrew J. Millar FRSE
- Born: London
- Education: University of Cambridge, The Rockefeller University
- Known for: Circadian rhythm, TOC1, bioluminescence imaging, modelling biological systems
- Awards: Fellow of the Royal Society, FRSE, EMBO member
- Scientific career
- Fields: Systems Biology, Plant Science, Chronobiology, Data Management.
- Workplaces: University of Virginia, University of Warwick, University of Edinburgh
- Thesis: (1994)
- Doctoral advisor: Nam-Hai Chua, FRS
- Other academic advisors: Steve A. Kay, Gene D. Block
- Website: http://www.amillar.org

Andrew John McWalter Millar is a Scottish chronobiologist, systems biologist, and molecular geneticist. Millar is a professor at The University of Edinburgh and also serves as its chair of systems biology. Millar is best known for his contributions to plant circadian biology; in the Steve Kay lab, he pioneered the use of luciferase imaging to identify circadian mutants in Arabidopsis. Additionally, Millar's group has implicated the ELF4 gene in circadian control of flowering time in Arabidopsis. Millar was elected to the Royal Society in 2012 and the Royal Society of Edinburgh in 2013.

== Life ==
Andrew Millar was raised in Luxembourg. He later attended Cambridge University where he received a Bachelor of Arts in 1988, studying genetics and winning University Prizes for botany in 1987 and genetics in 1988. After graduation, he began doctoral study in the United States at The Rockefeller University under the mentorship of Nam-Hai Chua, FRS, and graduated in 1994 with a PhD in plant molecular genetics. He then completed a postdoctoral fellowship at the National Science Foundation (NSF) Center for Biological Timing at the University of Virginia under the guidance of Steve A. Kay and Gene D. Block in 1995. In 1996, he joined the faculty of the University of Warwick, where he began to work on synthetic and systems biology in conjunction with plant chronobiology. He remained at Warwick until 2005, when he joined the faculty at The University of Edinburgh. Millar helped found SynthSys, a centre for synthetic and systems biology research partnered with the University of Edinburgh, in 2007.

== Research ==
=== Luciferase and plant circadian biology ===
As a pioneering chronobiologist, Millar is known for his use of luciferase reporters for the purpose of studying plant circadian biology. Millar began experimenting with the firefly luciferase reporter gene as a graduate student at The Rockefeller University. In 1992, Millar and colleagues fused the Arabidopsis cab2 promoter and the firefly luciferase gene to establish a real-time reporter for circadian-regulated gene expression in plants. Millar tracked the rhythm of transcription from the cab2 promoter using a low-light video imaging system which tracks luciferase bioluminescence. Millar hypothesized that this model could be used to isolate mutants in the plant circadian clock.

In 1995, Millar and colleagues used this luciferase model to identify mutant Arabidopsis plants with abnormal cycling patterns. Millar's group found cab2 expression to oscillate with a shorter period in toc1 mutant plants compared to wild type plants. These methods and discoveries were published in and featured on the cover of Science magazine in February 1995. Millar's luciferase experiments have contributed immensely to the current understanding of the circadian clock in plants. Specifically, Millar's work in 1995 and 2012 have been integral in the development of the repressilator model in plants.

=== Role of ELF3 and ELF4 ===
With Kay's group, Millar identified roles for the ELF3 and ELF4 genes in the plant circadian system. Plants with loss-of-function mutations in elf3 exhibited arrhythmicity in constant light conditions but not in constant darkness, suggesting that elf3 was necessary for proper control of the clock by light. Additionally, Millar and colleagues showed that ELF3 and its paralog ELF4 are necessary for the proper rhythmic expression of two other important genes involved in the plant circadian clock, Circadian Clock Associated 1 (CCA1) and Late Elongated Hypocotyl (LHY). These early efforts greatly contributed to efforts to understand the mechanisms underlying the function of the plant circadian oscillator. ELF3 and ELF4 have been shown to be important mediators of light input into the plant circadian oscillator. The mechanisms underlying the oscillator's function, specifically the full extent of "ELF3" and "ELF4"'s interactions with other parts of the clock, are an active area of research.

=== Evolutionary biology of plant circadian clocks ===
In 2005, Millar and his colleagues discovered how plant circadian clocks increase photosynthesis and growth, thereby offering a selective advantage. First, they compared the survivability of wild-type Arabidopsis, which has a circadian period of about 24 hours, when grown in a 20-hour, then 24-hour, and lastly 28-hour light-dark cycle. Then they examined long (28-hour) and short (20-hour) period mutants grown in light-dark cycles that were similar to, or dissimilar from, their endogenous clock periods. In all three strains, leaves contained more chlorophyll when the period of the plant matched that of the environment. Additionally, both short and long period mutants fixed around 40% more carbon when exogenous periods matched their endogenous rhythms, consistent with the hypothesis of circadian resonance. Millar's experiments demonstrated one possible mechanism that has selected for circadian clock function during plant evolution.

=== Current research ===
In 2017, Millar and colleagues quantitatively explained and predicted canonical phenotypes of circadian timing in a multicellular, model organism. The research team used metabolic and physiological data to combine and extend mathematical models of rhythmic gene expression, photoperiod-dependent flowering, elongation growth, and starch metabolism within a framework model for Arabidopsis. The model predicted the effect of altered circadian timing upon particular phenotypes in clock-mutant plants. Whole-plant growth rate decreased, which was attributed to altered night-time metabolism of stored starch in addition to altered mobilisation of secondary stores of organic acids.

== Positions ==
- BBSRC Research Development Fellow (2002–2007)
- Manager of the Interdisciplinary Program for Cellular Regulation (2003–2004)
- Professor of Systems Biology, University of Edinburgh (2005–present)
- Founding Director of the Centre for Systems Biology at Edinburgh (2007–2011)
- Elected EMBO member (2011)
- Fellow of the Royal Society (2012) Resigned from the society on 12 February 2025 because of the Royal Society’s “inability to take proportionate action on Elon Musk’s current promotion of disinformation”.
- Fellow of the Royal Society of Edinburgh (2013)

== Awards ==
- Society for Experimental Biology President's Medal (1999)
- British Association for the Advancement of Science Charles Darwin Award Lecture (2000)
- Saltire Award for Scottish Research (2009)
- Aschoff's Rule (2015)

== See also ==
- Circadian rhythm
- ELF4
- Steve A. Kay
- Gene D. Block
