= Elaine M. Tobin =

American plant biologist

- Born: Elaine Munsey; December 23, 1944 (age 81); Louisville, Kentucky
- Education: Oberlin College, Harvard University
- Known for: Circadian clock in plants
- Partner(s): Allan J. Tobin, J. Philip Thornber
- Scientific career
- Workplaces: University of California, Los Angeles

Elaine Munsey Tobin (born December 23, 1944, Louisville, Kentucky) is a professor of molecular, cell, and developmental biology at the University of California, Los Angeles (UCLA). Tobin is recognized as a Pioneer Member of the American Society of Plant Biologists (ASPB).

Tobin studies how phytochrome photoreceptors interact with the circadian clock in plants, in particular circadian oscillator proteins and the ways in which feedback loops are regulated through gene expression. Tobin identified one of the first two components of the circadian clock in plants, the dawn expressed transcription factor CCA1. Her lab also showed that CCA1 was necessary for phytochrome response in Arabidopsis thaliana and that one type of regulation involves the phosphorylation of CCA1 by the protein kinase CK2.

== Early life and education ==
Elaine Munsey was born in Louisville, Kentucky on December 23, 1944. Her family had immigrated from Odessa and Lithuania. Munsey's interests included science, mathematics and basketball. She attended the 1960 Democratic National Convention as a volunteer working for Adlai Stevenson II's presidential campaign. While in high school, she also participated in civil rights marches and heard Martin Luther King Jr. speak in Louisville. She graduated from Seneca High School in Louisville in 1962.

She earned her Bachelor of Arts degree from Oberlin College in 1966, majoring in chemistry. After graduation, she spent a summer as an Appalachian Volunteer, working as a community organizer in Wolfe County, Kentucky, as part of Lyndon Johnson's War on Poverty.

She was accepted into the Biology Department at Stanford. She took classes in plant physiology with Winslow Briggs, worked in his laboratory, and transferred to Harvard when Briggs took a professorship there. In 1968 she married Allan J. Tobin. They spent a year at the Weizmann Institute of Science in Israel, where Elaine Tobin worked with plant geneticist Ezra Galun. After returning to North America, she completed her Ph.D. in Biology at Harvard University in 1972. She later married J. Philip Thornber.

== Career ==
In 1973 Tobin went to Brandeis University, where she did postdoctoral work with Attila Klein, on the influence of light on the development of plants. In 1975 she was hired in the Biology Department at University of California, Los Angeles (UCLA). Support was sparse, but she was able to get funding for basic research on plants from the National Institutes of Health (NIH). She was able to obtain laboratory space previously used by retiring professor Karl Hamner.

As a student with Winslow Briggs, Tobin had been introduced to the effects of phytochrome on flowering and to the work of Karl Hamner on circadian rhythms and flowering. Circadian rhythms in plants help them to coordinate with external light/dark cycles. Anticipating dawn, dusk, and seasonal day length allows plants to more effectively regulate both daily and seasonal activities, including the movement of leaves and petals, the opening of stomata for photosynthesis, stem growth, and the development of flowers.

Tobin first used Lemna gibba (duckweed) and later Arabidopsis thaliana (cress) as model plant systems to study light regulation of gene expression in plants, examining interactions between phytochrome photoreceptors, genes, and circadian rhythms. Tobin was able to isolate poly(A) RNA from duckweed, expose slab gels to x-ray film, and show that while some mRNAs decreased in light, others increased.

In 1984, postdoctoral student Jane Silverthorne and Tobin demonstrated that photoreceptors in plants could affect the transcription of specific genes. Light-harvesting chlorophyll a/b-binding (LHCB) protein sequences from Lemna gibba were low in darkness but could be rapidly and reversibly restored by light exposure. Tobin's group also demonstrated phytochrome regulation of LHCB proteins (also known as cab genes) in Arabidopsis. By growing duckweed heterotrophically in the dark, and exposing it briefly to red and far-red light, Tobin demonstrated the effects of phytochromes on plant growth and transcription in rcbs genes.

In a series of experiments beginning in 1993, Tobin's lab described DNA-binding activity with an affinity for LHCB in plant cells. Using a DNA fragment, they screened the Arabidopsis expression library, and cloned a protein with relevant binding activity, which they named CCA1. They showed that Circadian Clock Associated 1 (CCA1) was necessary for phytochrome response in Arabidopsis thaliana. Reports on the activity of CCA1 and a closely related gene (LHY) from George Coupland were submitted together to Cell in 1998. The two genes were the first two components of the circadian clock or central oscillator mechanism in plants to be identified. Among many other studies of the regulation and function of CCA1, Tobin has determined that one method of clock regulation involves the phosphorylation of CCA1 by the protein kinase CK2.

Elaine M. Tobin retired from teaching in 2014.

== Selected research ==
- Tobin, Elaine M.; Klein, Attila O. (1 July 1975). "Isolation and Translation of Plant Messenger RNA". Plant Physiology. 56 (1): 88–92. doi:10.1104/pp.56.1.88. PMC 541303. PMID 16659264.
- Silverthorne, Jane; Tobin, Elaine M. (February 1984). "Demonstration of transcriptional regulation of specific genes by phytochrome action". Proceedings of the National Academy of Sciences. 81 (4): 1112–1116. Bibcode:1984PNAS...81.1112S. doi:10.1073/pnas.81.4.1112. ISSN 0027-8424. PMC 344775. PMID 16593420.
- Tobin, E M; Silverthorne, J (1 June 1985). "Light Regulation of Gene Expression in Higher Plants". Annual Review of Plant Physiology. 36 (1): 569–593. doi:10.1146/annurev.pp.36.060185.003033. ISSN 0066-4294.
- Karlin-Neumann, George A.; Sun, Lin; Tobin, Elaine M. (1 December 1988). "Expression of Light-Harvesting Chlorophyll a/b -Protein Genes Is Phytochrome-Regulated in Etiolated Arabidopsis thaliana Seedlings". Plant Physiology. 88 (4): 1323–1331. doi:10.1104/pp.88.4.1323. PMC 1055760. PMID 16666462.
- Wang, Z Y; Kenigsbuch, D; Sun, L; Harel, E; Ong, M S; Tobin, E M (April 1997). "A Myb-related transcription factor is involved in the phytochrome regulation of an Arabidopsis Lhcb gene". The Plant Cell. 9 (4): 491–507. doi:10.1105/tpc.9.4.491. PMC 156934. PMID 9144958.
- Wang, Zhi-Yong; Tobin, Elaine M (June 1998). "Constitutive Expression of the CIRCADIAN CLOCK ASSOCIATED 1 (CCA1) Gene Disrupts Circadian Rhythms and Suppresses Its Own Expression". Cell. 93 (7): 1207–1217. doi:10.1016/s0092-8674(00)81464-6. PMID 9657153. S2CID 18992734.
- Daniel, Xavier; Sugano, Shoji; Tobin, Elaine M. (2 March 2004). "CK2 phosphorylation of CCA1 is necessary for its circadian oscillator function in Arabidopsis". Proceedings of the National Academy of Sciences of the United States of America. 101 (9): 3292–3297. Bibcode:2004PNAS..101.3292D. doi:10.1073/pnas.0400163101. ISSN 0027-8424. PMC 365783. PMID 14978263.
