= Alex A.R. Webb =

Alex A.R. Webb is a plant biologist whose computational, genetic, and physiological studies center around plant chronobiology. He currently serves as the head of the Circadian Signal Transduction Group in the University of Cambridge's Department of Plant Sciences researching circadian pathways and what regulates them.

== Education ==
Webb obtained his Bachelor of Science in biology from the University of Stirling in Scotland between 1984 and 1988. Following this, from 1989 to 1992, he received a PhD in plant molecular biology from Lancaster University.

== Research positions ==
Between 1992 and 1998, Webb continued as a postdoctoral research associate at Lancaster University. After this, he received a Royal Society University Research Fellowship to work at the University of Cambridge from 1998 to 2007, and from 2004 to 2007 he was a lecturer as head of Circadian Signal Transduction Research Group. From 2007 to 2011, Webb worked as a senior lecturer as the head of the Circadian Signal Transduction Group at the University of Cambridge, where from 2011 he works as a reader and lectures on plant biology and intracellular signaling in plants.

== Awards ==
Webb has been awarded as a Membre Assocé Académie royale de Belgique (Associate Member of the Royal Academy of Belgium).

== Scientific contributions ==
=== Plant chronobiology ===
Webb's research surrounding the model organism, Arabidopsis thaliana, has demonstrated that photosynthetic cues are responsible for maintaining and entraining the endogenous clocks of plants. Specifically, his early research demonstrates that plants' circadian rhythms control the daily opening of the stomata and nightly closing of the stomata through control by the circadian oscillator gene TOC1. Webb's research has also shown that the concentration of free calcium in plant cells exists in a rhythmic cycle and is under the regulation of circadian oscillators. Later research performed at Webb's lab revealed that circadian oscillations of calcium occur due to the circadian regulation of cyclic ADPR. His work has also revealed that carbohydrate metabolism is capable of altering the core oscillator's phase, as well as entraining to it. Further research identified PRR7 as being involved in the sensing of carbohydrates by the circadian oscillator, allowing clocks in underground tissues, like roots, to synchronize their clocks to other parts of the plant, such as the leaves. Webb has also demonstrated the key finding that having a circadian clock that is matched to the period of the environmental cycle increases fitness traits in plants. His research has also shown PRR7 mutations affect the plasticity of the clock, which is the ability to respond to environmental signals such as light and temperature that set the pace of the clock. This plasticity is important in ensuring that the components of the circadian oscillator have peak activity at different times of day.

=== "Chronoculture" ===
Webb's scientific research has led to the discovery that plants' circadian clocks allow them to anticipate and synchronize their growth and development to the time of day or year. This synchronized growth increases the plants' size, enhancing their fitness for their given environment and giving them a competitive evolutionary advantage. Webb's lab also works with wheat to determine how different traits are affected if they disrupt the circadian clock. The goal of this work is to develop an understanding of the circadian clock and how genetic modification and environmental control, like optimized temperature or light cycles, can be used to create 'highly efficient growth', to do things like decrease pest damage or make more sustainable food production.

=== Current work ===
Webb's current scientific efforts are centered around investigating the methods of calcium signaling in plants, how these calcium-based signaling pathways regulate circadian oscillators, whether any other metals, like Magnesium, may contribute to the regulation of circadian clocks in plants, and how wheat varieties can be improved through chronoculture or altering their circadian clocks.

== Notable publications ==
The following publications that Webb has co-authored have been published in notable journals, such as Science and Nature. Additionally, all of them have been cited multiple times by other works. Some of these works have led to key findings that have shaped the field of plant chronobiology, like the fitness advantages provided by having an internal clock entrained to the environment.

- Webb, A.A.R. (2003), The physiology of circadian rhythms in plants. New Phytologist, 160: 281-303. https://doi.org/10.1046/j.1469-8137.2003.00895.x
- Dodd, A. N., Salathia, N., Hall, A., Kévei Eva, Tóth Réka, Nagy, F., Hibberd, J. M., Millar, A. J., & Webb, A. A. (2005). Plant circadian clocks increase photosynthesis, growth, survival, and competitive advantage. Science, 309(5734), 630–633. https://doi.org/10.1126/science.1115581
- Dodd, A. N., Gardner, M. J., Hotta, C. T., Hubbard, K. E., Dalchau, N., Love, J., Assie, J.-M., Robertson, F. C., Jakobsen, M. K., Gonçalves Jorge, Sanders, D., & Webb, A. A. (2007). The Arabidopsis circadian clock incorporates a CADPR-based feedback loop. Science, 318(5857), 1789–1792. https://doi.org/10.1126/science.1146757
- Haydon, M., Mielczarek, O., Robertson, F. et al. Photosynthetic entrainment of the Arabidopsis thaliana circadian clock. Nature 502, 689–692 (2013). https://doi.org/10.1038/nature12603
- Martí Ruiz, M.C., Hubbard, K.E., Gardner, M.J. et al. Circadian oscillations of cytosolic free calcium regulate the Arabidopsis circadian clock. Nature Plants 4, 690–698 (2018). https://doi.org/10.1038/s41477-018-0224-8
- Steed, G., Ramirez, D. C., Hannah, M. A., & Webb, A. A. R. (2021). Chronoculture, harnessing the circadian clock to improve crop yield and sustainability. Science, 372(6541), eabc9141. https://doi.org/10.1126/science.abc9141

== Collaborators ==
Webb's work has featured the collaboration of other chronobiologists, including the following:

- Professor Malcolm Bennett from the University of Nottingham
- Professor Gilliham from the University of Adelaide
- Professor Jorge Goncalves from the University of Luxembourg
- Dr. Akiko Satake from Kyushu University
- Dr. Phil Wigge from the University of Potsdam, Germany

Additionally, his lab collaborates with individuals from the National Institute of Agricultural Botany and BASF in Ghent, Belgium.

Webb is also listed as a recurring co-author with the following scientists, some of whom were his mentees:

- Antony Dodd
- Michael J. Haydon
- John Love
