= Pseudo-response regulator =

Group of genes that regulate circadian oscillator in plants

Pseudo-response regulator (PRR) refers to a group of genes that regulate the circadian oscillator in plants. There are four primary PRR proteins (PRR9, PRR7, PRR5 and TOC1/PRR1) that perform the majority of interactions with other proteins within the circadian oscillator, and another (PRR3) that has limited function. These genes are all paralogs of each other, and all repress the transcription of Circadian Clock Associated 1 (CCA1) and Late Elongated Hypocotyl (LHY) at various times throughout the day. The expression of PRR9, PRR7, PRR5 and TOC1/PRR1 peak around morning, mid-day, afternoon and evening, respectively. As a group, these genes are one part of the three-part repressilator system that governs the biological clock in plants.

== Discovery ==
Multiple labs identified the PRR genes as parts of the circadian clock in the 1990s. In 2000, Akinori Matsushika, Seiya Makino, Masaya Kojima, and Takeshi Mizuno were the first to understand PRR genes as pseudo-response repressor genes rather than as response regulator (ARR) genes. The factor that distinguishes PRR from ARR genes is the lack of a phospho-accepting aspartate site that characterizes ARR proteins. Though their research that discovered PRR genes was primarily hailed during the early 2000s as informing the scientific community about the function of TOC1 (named APRR1 by the Mizuno lab), an additional pseudo-response regulator in the Arabidopsis thaliana biological clock, the information about PRR genes that Matsushika and his team found deepened scientific understanding of circadian clocks in plants and led other researchers to hypothesize about the purpose of the PRR genes. Though current research has identified TOC1, PRR3, PRR5, PRR7, and PRR9 as of importance to the A. thaliana circadian clock mechanism, Matsushika et al. first categorized PRR genes into two subgroups (APRR1 and APRR2, the A stands for Arabidopsis) due to two differing amino acid structures. The negative feedback loops including PRR genes, proposed by Mizuno, were incorporated into a complex repressilator circuit by Andrew Millar's lab in 2012. The conception of the plant biological clock as made up of interacting negative feedback loops is unique in comparison to mammal and fungal circadian clocks which contain autoregulatory negative feedback loops with positive and negative elements (see "Transcriptional and non-transcriptional control on the Circadian clock page).

== Function and Interactions ==
PRR3, PRR5, PRR7 and PRR9 participate in the repressilator of a negative autoregulatory feedback loop that synchronizes to environmental inputs. The repressilator has a morning, evening, and night loop that are regulated in part by the pseudo-response regulator proteins' interactions with CCA1 and LHY. CCA1 and LHY exhibit peak binding to PRR9, PRR7, and PRR5 in the morning, evening, and night, respectively.

=== PRR3 and PRR5 ===
When phosphorylated by an unknown kinase, PRR5 and PRR3 proteins demonstrate increased binding to TIMING OF CAB2 EXPRESSION 1 ( TOC1). This interaction stabilizes both TOC1 and PRR5 and prevents their degradation by the F-box protein ZEITLUPE (ZTL). Through this mechanism, PRR5 is indirectly activated by light, as ZTL is inhibited by light. Additionally, PRR5 contributes to the transcriptional repression of the genes encoding the single MYB transcription factors CCA1 and LHY.

=== PRR7 and PRR9 ===
Two single MYB transcription factors, CCA1 and LHY, activate expression of PRR7 and PRR9. In turn, PRR7 and PRR9 repress CCA1 and LHY through the binding of their promoters. This interaction forms the morning loop of the repressilator of the biological clock in A. thaliana. Chromatin immunoprecipitation demonstrates that LUX binds to the PRR9 promoter to repress it. Additionally, ELF3 has been shown to activate PRR9 and repress CCA1 and LHY. PRR9 is also activated by alternative RNA splicing. When PRMT5 (a methylation factor) is prevented from methylating intron 2 of PRR9, a frameshift resulting in premature truncation occurs.

PRR7 and PRR9 also play a role in the entrainment of A. thaliana to a temperature cycle. Double-mutant plants with inactivated PRR7 and PRR9 exhibit extreme period lengthening at high temperatures but show no change in period at low temperatures. However, the inactivation of CCA1 and LHY in the PRR7/PRR9 loss-of-function mutants shows no change in period at high temperatures—this suggests that PRR7 and PRR9 are acting by overcompensation.

== Interactions Within Arabidopsis ==
In A. thaliana, the main feedback loop is proposed to involve a transcriptional regulation between several proteins. The three main components of this loop are TOC1 (also known as PRR1), CCA1 and LHY. Each individual component peaks in transcriptions at different times of day. PRR 9, 7 and 5 each significantly reduce the transcription levels of CCA1 and LHY. In the opposite manner, PRR 9 and 7 slightly increase the transcription levels of TOC1. The Constans (CO) is also indirectly regulated by the PRR proteins as well by setting up the molecular mechanism to dictate the photosensitive period in the afternoon. PRRs are also known to stabilize CO at certain times of day to mediate its accumulation. This results in the regulation of early flowering in shorter photoperiods, making light sensitivity and control of flowering time important functions of the PRR class.

== Homologs ==
=== Paralogs ===
PPR3, PRR5, PRR7, and PRR9 are all paralogs of each other. They have similar structure, and all repress the transcription of CCA1 and LHY. Additionally, they are all characterized by their lack of a phospho-accepting aspartate site. These genes are also paralogs to TOC1, which is alternatively called PRR1.

=== Orthologs ===
Several pseudo-response regulators have been found in Selaginella, but their function has not yet been explored.

== Mutants ==
As PRR is a family of genes, several rounds mutant screening have been performed to identify each possible phenotype.

=== Rhythmicity Phenotype ===
In regards to rhythmicity of the clock in a free running setting PRR9 and PRR5 are associated with longer and shorter periods respectively. For each gene, the double mutant with PRR7 exacerbates observed trends in rhythmicity. The triple mutant renders the plant arrhythmic.

=== Flowering Time Phenotype ===
In terms of flowering time in long day conditions, all mutants made the observed flowering late, with PRR7 significantly more late in comparison to the other mutants. All double mutants with PRR7 saw much later flowering time than the PRR5/PRR9 mutant.

=== Light Sensitivity Phenotype ===
With regard to light sensitivity, particularly in red light which is associated with hypocotyl lengthening, all PRR mutants were observed to be hypo-sensitive with PRR9 showing to be less sensitive. All the double mutants were equal in hyposensitivity as the PRR5 or PRR7 mutants; the triple mutant is extremely hypo-sensitive.

== Future research ==
Recent research has shown that expression of clock genes show tissue-specificity. Learning about how, when, and why specific tissues show certain peaks in clock genes like PRR can reveal more about the subtle nuances of each gene within the repressilator.

Few investigations into the circadian oscillator mechanisms in species other than A. thaliana have taken place; learning which genes are responsible for clock functions in other species will give more insight into the similarities and differences in clocks across plant species.

The mechanistic details of each step in the plant biological clock repressilator system have yet to be fully understood. An understanding of these will give knowledge of clock function and, across species, increase understanding of the ecological and evolutionary functions of circadian oscillators.

Additionally, identifying direct targets of PRR5, PRR7 and PRR9 that are not CCA1 and LHY will provide information about the molecular links from the PRRs to output genes like the flowering pathway and metabolism in mitochondria, which are CCA1-independent.

== See also ==
- TOC1 (gene)
- CCA1
- Circadian Clock
