= Circadian Clock Associated 1 =

Gene that is central to the circadian oscillator of angiosperms

Identifiers
- Organism: A. thaliana
- Symbol: CCA1
- RefSeq (mRNA): NM_180129.3
- RefSeq (Prot): NC_003071.7

Other data
- Chromosome: 2: 19.25 - 19.25 Mb

Circadian Clock Associated 1 (CCA1) is a gene that is central to the circadian oscillator of angiosperms. It was first identified in Arabidopsis thaliana in 1993. CCA1 interacts with LHY and TOC1 to form the core of the oscillator system. CCA1 expression peaks at dawn. Loss of CCA1 function leads to a shortened period in the expression of many other genes.

== Discovery ==
CCA1 was first identified in Arabidopsis thaliana by Elaine M. Tobin's lab in UCLA in 1993. Tobin's lab was studying promoter fragments that contribute to light regulation of light-harvesting Chlorophyll A/B Binding Protein (LHCB), and noticed DNA-binding activity that had affinity for a specific light-responsive fragment of the LHCB promoter. This DNA-binding activity was designated as CA-1 because the binding is mostly to cytosine and adenine-rich sequences.

They found that this binding activity is necessary for phytochrome response. They later found the gene responsible for this activity by screening the Arabidopsis expression library. CCA1 referred to the CA-1 clone, and now designated the gene responsible for this DNA binding activity. The evolution of circadian clocks in land plants is not understood, because circadian rhythms have received little attention in plants other than angiosperms.

== Function ==
CCA1 is part of a negative autoregulatory feedback loop that is coordinated with the daily environmental changes. Repressed in the dark by other proteins, CCA1's expression is activated when light is sensed by the phytochrome in the plant. After translation, the CCA1 protein needs to be phosphorylated by casein kinase 2 (CK2). This phosphorylation is necessary for the protein to form a homodimer and to bind to its target promoters. Hyperphosphorylation, due to the overexpression of CK2, will lead to altered circadian rhythms in the mutants where CCA1 showed shorter mRNA circadian oscillation than in wild-type plants. CK2 overexpression is significant in demonstrating CCA1 is part of the clock. The protein motif CCA1 uses to bind to its target DNA sequences is its Myb-like domain. CCA1 only has one Myb domain, whereas other plant and mammalian proteins could have multiple Myb domains. The presence of only one Myb domain in CCA1 shows its importance influence in the circadian clock. LUX is also an important Myb transcription factor that is necessary for CCA/LHY transcription. This can also help account for problems in the repressilator model described below. CCA1 is also unusual in that it has the ability to bind to asymmetric DNA sequences. CCA1 acts to suppress the expression of the DNA sequence it binds to. The stability of CCA1 protein is not affected by light or dark. It is regulated by its proteasome. Inhibiting proteasome function leads to a circadian rhythm with a longer period.

== CCA1 and the Arabidopsis circadian oscillator ==
The Arabidopsis central oscillator contains several proteins that reciprocally repress genes encoding each other to achieve a negative feedback loop necessary to generate circadian rhythms controlling many clock outputs. CCA1 is a key component of this oscillator. Light induces its transcription, and mRNA levels peak at dawn along with Late Elongated Hypocotyl (LHY). CCA1 and LHY associate to inhibit transcription of the Evening Complex (EC) proteins: ELF4, ELF3 and LUX, which suppresses their accumulation until dusk when LHY and CCA1 protein levels are at their lowest. The EC inhibits transcription PRR9 and TOC1 at night. These, along with the remaining PRR proteins PRR7 and PRR5 are involved in suppressing CCA1 and LHY levels, which increase during the night. CCA1 is further involved in maintaining this loop by inhibiting its own expression.

== Homologs ==
=== Paralogs ===
LHY Late Elongated Hypocotyl also has a Myb domain and functions early in the morning. Both LHY and CCA1 have similar patterns of expression, which could be induced by light. Single loss of function mutants in both genes result in seemingly identical phenotypes. But LHY cannot fully rescue the rhythm when CCA1 is absent, indicating that they may only be partially functionally redundant. Under constant light conditions, cca1 and lhy double loss of function mutants fail to maintain rhythms in clock controlled RNAs.

=== Orthologs ===
The circadian oscillator in rice is similar to the Arabidopsis model, and researchers have used this model as a blueprint for understand the rice oscillator. OsLHY in rice serves a similar function as CCA1/LHY and is thus an ortholog of the gene in rice. OsPRR1 in rice is also an ortholog of TOC1. PpCCA1a and PpCCA1b are orthologs of CCA1 and LHy in the moss Physcomitrella patens. They show rhythms with a period of 1 day like their angiosperm homologs in 24-hour light-dark cycles or constant darkness. However these genes show arrhythmicity in constant light conditions, in contrast to CCA1:LHY.

== Mutants ==
Mutants such as cca1-1 plants, which lack CCA1 protein, show short period phenotypes for the expression of several genes when assayed under constant light conditions. They also have a period 3 hours shorter than that of the wild-type plant, which demonstrates that expression of LHY, its homolog, cannot fully compensate for the loss of the function of CCA1. Plants that have lost function of LHY and CCA1 (lhy;cca1) lost the ability to stably maintain circadian rhythm and other output phenomena. In one study, lhy;cca1 show photoperiod- insensitive early flowering under long- day (16 hours of light/ 8 hours of dark) conditions and short day (8 hours of light, 16 hours of dark conditions), and arrhythmicity under constant light conditions. However they retain some circadian function in light/dark cycles, showing that Arabidopsis circadian clock is not completely dependent on CCA1 and LHY activity. Plants with non-functioning LHY and CCA1 show a wavy leaf phenotype in constant light conditions. Mutants also have increased vascular pattern complexity in their leaves, with more areoles, branch points and free ends than wild-type Arabidopsis.

== See also ==
- TOC1
- Steve Kay
- Arabidopsis
- Oscillating gene
- Circadian Rhythm
