= Detroit Red (apple) =

Apple cultivar

'Detroit Red'
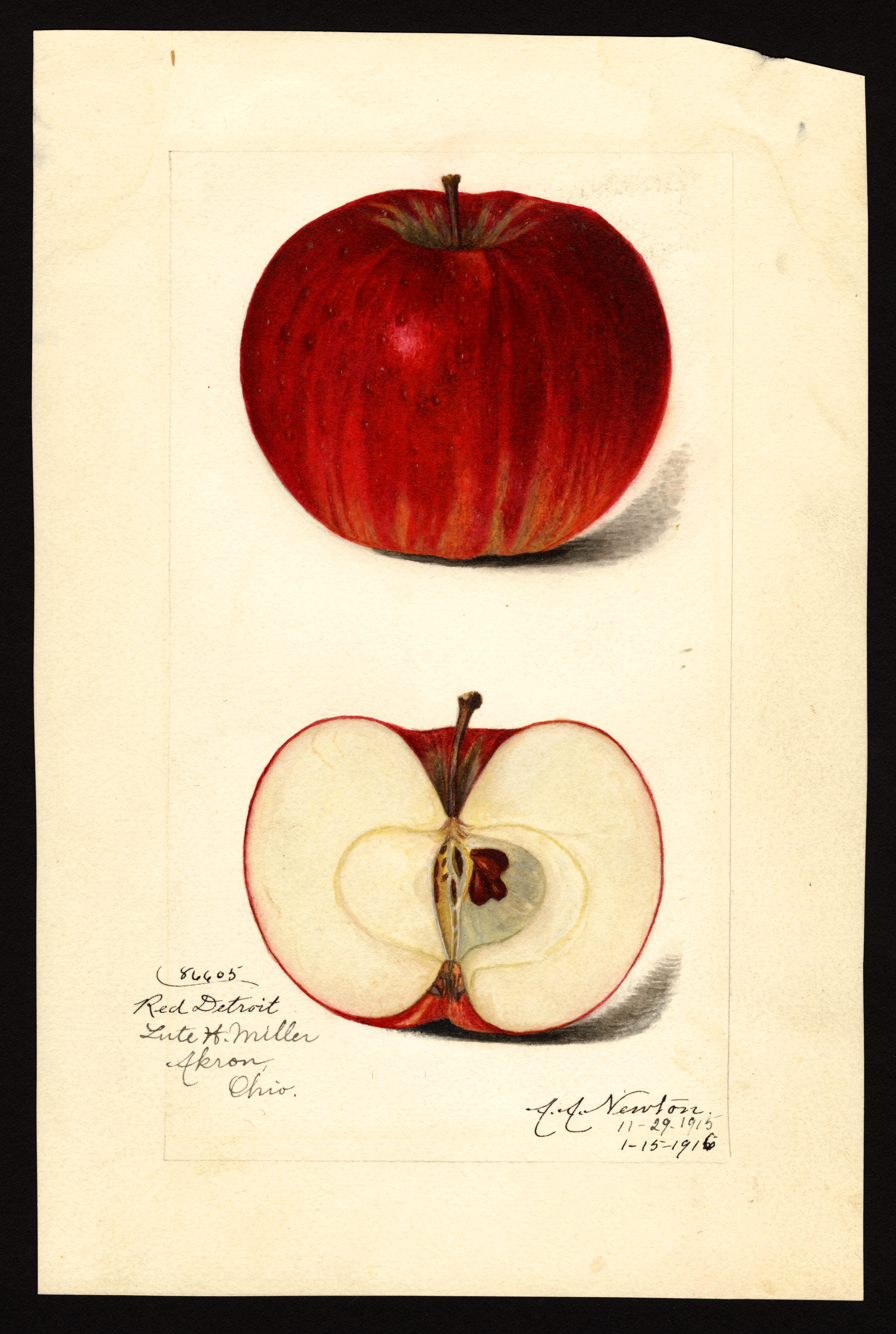
- Genus: Malus
- Species: M. domestica
- Cultivar: 'Detroit Red'

'Detroit Red' is a variable apple cultivar, possibly the same as 'Detroit Black', that gives fruit of mediocre quality, somewhat unreliably or biennially. It was grown at Monticello by Thomas Jefferson.
