= Oscillating gene =

Gene expressed in periodic cycles

In molecular biology, an oscillating gene is a gene that is expressed in a rhythmic pattern or in periodic cycles. Oscillating genes are usually circadian and can be identified by periodic changes in the state of an organism. Circadian rhythms, controlled by oscillating genes, have a period of approximately 24 hours. For example, plant leaves opening and closing at different times of the day or the sleep-wake schedule of animals can all include circadian rhythms. Other periods are also possible, such as 29.5 days resulting from circalunar rhythms or 12.4 hours resulting from circatidal rhythms. Oscillating genes include both core clock component genes and output genes. A core clock component gene is a gene necessary for to the pacemaker. However, an output oscillating gene, such as the AVP gene, is rhythmic but not necessary to the pacemaker.

== History ==
The first recorded observations of oscillating genes come from the marches of Alexander the Great in the fourth century B.C. At this time, one of Alexander's generals, Androsthenes, wrote that the tamarind tree would open its leaves during the day and close them at nightfall. Until 1729, the rhythms associated with oscillating genes were assumed to be "passive responses to a cyclic environment". In 1729, Jean-Jacques d'Ortous de Mairan demonstrated that the rhythms of a plant opening and closing its leaves continued even when placed somewhere where sunlight could not reach it. This was one of the first indications that there was an active element to the oscillations. In 1923, Ingeborg Beling published her paper "Über das Zeitgedächtnis der Bienen" ("On the Time Memory of Bees") which extended oscillations to animals, specifically bees In 1971, Ronald Konopka and Seymour Benzer discovered that mutations of the PERIOD gene caused changes in the circadian rhythm of flies under constant conditions. They hypothesized that the mutation of the gene was affecting the basic oscillator mechanism. Paul Hardin, Jeffrey Hall, and Michael Rosbash demonstrated that relationship by discovering that within the PERIOD gene, there was a feedback mechanism that controlled the oscillation. The mid-1990s saw an outpouring of discoveries, with CLOCK, CRY, and others being added to the growing list of oscillating genes.

== Molecular circadian mechanisms ==
The primary molecular mechanism behind an oscillating gene is best described as a transcription/translation feedback loop. This loop contains both positive regulators, which increase gene expression, and negative regulators, which decrease gene expression. The fundamental elements of these loops are found across different phyla. In the mammalian circadian clock, for example, transcription factors CLOCK and BMAL1 are the positive regulators. CLOCK and BMAL1 bind to the E-box of oscillating genes, such as Per1, Per2, and Per3 and Cry1 and Cry2, and upregulate their transcription. When the PERs and CRYs form a heterocomplex in the cytoplasm and enter the nucleus again, they inhibit their own transcription. This means that over time the mRNA and protein levels of PERs and CRYs, or any other oscillating gene under this mechanism, will oscillate.

There also exists a secondary feedback loop, or 'stabilizing loop', which regulates the cyclic expression of Bmal1. This is caused by two nuclear receptors, REV-ERB and ROR, which suppresses and activates Bmal1 transcription, respectively.

In addition to these feedback loops, post-translational modifications also play a role in changing the characteristics of the circadian clock, such as its period. Without any type of feedback repression, the molecular clock would have a period of just a few hours. Casein kinase members CK1ε and CK1δ were both found to be mammalian protein kinases involved in circadian regulation. Mutations in these kinases are associated with familial advanced sleep phase syndrome (FASPS). In general, phosphorylation is necessary for the degradation of PERs via ubiquitin ligases. In contrast, phosphorylation of BMAL1 via CK2 is important for accumulation of BMAL1.

== Examples ==
The genes provided in this section are only a small number of the vast amount of oscillating genes found in the world. These genes were selected because they were determined to be the some of most important genes in regulating the circadian rhythm of their respective classification.

=== Mammalian genes ===
- Cry1 and Cry2 – Cryptochromes are a class of blue light sensitive flavoproteins found in plants and animals. Cry1 and Cry2 code for the proteins CRY1 and CRY2. In Drosophila, CRY1 and CRY2 bind to TIM, a circadian gene that is a component of the transcription-translation negative feedback loop, in a light dependent fashion and blocks its function. In mammals, CRY1 and CRY2 are light independent and function to inhibit the CLOCK-BMAL1 dimer of the circadian clock which regulates cycling of Per1 transcription.
- Bmal1 – Bmal1 also known as ARNTL or Aryl hydrocarbon receptor nuclear translocator-like, encodes a protein that forms a heterodimer with the CLOCK protein. This heterodimer binds to E-box enhancers found in the promoter regions of many genes such as Cry1 and Cry2 and Per1-3, thereby activating transcription. The resulting proteins translocate back into the nucleus and act as negative regulators by interacting with CLOCK and/or BMAL1 inhibiting transcription.
- Clock – Clock, also known as Circadian Locomotor Output Cycles Kaput, is a transcription factor in the circadian pacemaker of mammals. It affects both the persistence and period of circadian rhythms by its interactions with the gene Bmal1. For more information, refer to Bmal1.
- Per genes – There are three different per genes, also known as Period genes, (per 1, per 2, and per 3) that are related by sequence in mice. Transcription levels for mPer1 increase in the late night before subjective dawn and is followed by increases in the levels of mPer3 and then by mPer2. mPer1 peaks at CT 4-6, mPer3 at CT 4 and 8 and mPer2 at CT 8. mPer1 is necessary for phase shifts induced by light or glutamate release. mPer 2 and mPer3 are involved in resetting the circadian clock to environmental light cues.

=== Drosophila genes ===
- Clock – The clock gene in Drosophila encodes for the CLOCK protein and forms a heterodimer with the protein CYCLE in order to control the main oscillating activity of the circadian clock. The heterodimer binds to the E-box promoter region of both per and tim which causes activation of their respective gene expression. Once protein levels for both PER and TIM have reached a critical point, they too dimerize and interact with the CLOCK-CYCLE heterodimer to prevent it from binding to the E-Box and activating transcription. This negative feedback loop is essential for the functioning and timing of the circadian clock.
- Cycle – the cycle gene encodes for the CYCLE protein to form a heterodimer with the protein CLOCK. The heterodimer creates a transcription-translation feedback loop that controls the levels of both the PER and TIM gene. This feedback loop has been shown to be imperative for both the functioning and timing of the circadian clock in Drosophila. For more information, refer to Clock.
- Per – The per gene is a clock gene that encodes for the PER protein in Drosophila. The protein levels and transcription rates of PER demonstrate robust circadian rhythms that peak around CT 16. It creates a heterodimer with TIM to control the circadian rhythm. The heterodimer enters the nucleus in order to inhibit the CLOCK-CYCLE heterodimer which acts as a transcriptional activator for per and tim. This results in an inhibition of the transcription factors of per and tim thereby lowering the respective mRNA levels and protein levels. For more information, refer to Clock.
- Timeless – The tim gene encodes for the TIM protein that is critical in circadian regulation in Drosophila. Its protein levels and transcription rates demonstrate a circadian oscillation that peaks at around CT 16. TIM binds to the PER protein to create a heterodimer whose transcription-translation feedback loop controls the periodicity and phase of the circadian rhythms. For more information, refer to Period and Clock.

=== Fungal genes ===
- Frq – The Frq gene, also known as the Frequency gene, encodes central components of an oscillatory loop within the circadian clock in Neurospora. In the oscillator's feedback loop, frq gives rise to transcripts that encode for two forms of the FRQ protein. Both forms are required for robust rhythmicity throughout the organism. Rhythmic changes in the amount of frq transcript are essential for synchronous activity, and abrupt changes in frq levels reset the clock.

=== Bacterial genes ===
- Kai genes – Found in the cyanobacterium Synechococcus elongatus, these genes are essential components of the cyanobacterium clock, the leading example of bacterial circadian rhythms. Kai proteins regulate genome wide gene expression. The oscillation of phosphorylation and dephosphorylation of KaiC acts as the pacemaker of the circadian clock.

=== Plant genes ===
- CCA1 – The CCA1 gene, also known as Circadian and Clock Associated Gene 1, is a gene that is especially important in maintaining the rhythmicity of plant cellular oscillations. Overexpression, results in the loss of rhythmic expression of clock controlled genes (CCGs), loss of photoperiod control, and loss of rhythmicity in LHY expression. See LHY gene below for more information.
- LHY – The LHY gene, also known as the Late Elongated Hypocotyl gene, is a gene found in plants that encodes components of mutually regulatory negative feedback loops with CCA1 in which overexpression of either results in dampening of both of their expression. This negative feedback loop affects the rhythmicity of multiple outputs creating a daytime protein complex.
- Toc1 gene – Toc1, also known as Timing of CAB Expression 1 gene, is an oscillating gene found in the plants that is known to control the expression of CAB. It has been shown to affect the period of circadian rhythms through its repression of transcription factors. This was found through mutations of toc1 in plants that had shortened period of CAB expression.

== See also ==
- Chronobiology
