= Jane Silverthorne =

British plant biologist (1953–2022)

- Born: July 26, 1953; Somerset, England
- Died: August 15, 2022 (aged 69); Arlington, Virginia, USA
- Scientific career
- Fields: Plant biology
- Thesis: Chloroplast gene expression during leaf development
- Doctoral advisors: R. John Ellis

Jane Silverthorne (July 26, 1953 – August 15, 2022) was a biologist based in America who worked on plant development in response to light. She became a program officer at the National Science Foundation in the USA as well as a Senior Policy Analyst for the White House Office on Science and Technology.

== Early life and education ==
Silverthorne was born in England. Her father, William Silverthorne, was in the navy so the family that included her mother Margaret and sister moved between England, Scotland and Malta during her childhood. She developed an interest in plants at her secondary school, Farnham Girls' Grammar School in Surrey. She gained her B.Sc. degree in biology from the University of Sussex followed by her doctorate in 1980 at University of Warwick working on chloroplasts under the supervision of R. John Ellis FRS. She then undertook post-doctoral research at the University of California Los Angeles in the 1980s with Elaine M. Tobin and her research developed to focus on the phytochrome light detecting pigments. They demonstrated that some phytochromes controlled the transcription of some genes involved in photosynthesis.

== Career ==
Silverthorne was a member of faculty at the University of California Santa Cruz from 1987 until 2004, attaining a full professorship. In 2002 her laboratory at UC Santa Cruz was one of several destroyed in a fire.

She was a permanent program officer at the National Science Foundation for two decades from 2004 after taking a temporary post there in 1999, keeping up with the rapid changes to plant science in the early twenty-first century. She was responsible for managing the Plant Genome Program and also developed policies to support young researchers and collaborative projects in developing countries. This included initiating the Basic Research to Enable Agricultural Development (BREAD) program in collaboration with the Bill & Melinda Gates Foundation. From November 2006 to March 2008 she was a senior policy analyst in the life sciences in the White House Office of Science and Technology Policy. in 2014 she became the deputy assistant director for the Biological Sciences Directorate at the NSF. She retired in 2017, and died in Arlington, Virginia on August 15, 2022.

== Publications ==
Silverthorne's over 25 scientific publications include:

- Christensen, Steen; Silverthorne, Jane (2001) Origins of phytochrome-modulated Lhcb mRNA expression in seed plants Plant Physiology 126 (4) 1609–1618
- Peer, W; Silverthorne, J; Peters J.L. (1996) Developmental and light-regulated expression of individual members of the light-harvesting complex b gene family in Pinus palustris Plant Physiology 111 (2) 627–634
- Silverthorne, Jane; Tobin, Elaine M. (February 1984). "Demonstration of transcriptional regulation of specific genes by phytochrome action". Proceedings of the National Academy of Sciences. 81 (4): 1112–1116. Bibcode:1984PNAS...81.1112S. doi:10.1073/pnas.81.4.1112. ISSN 0027-8424. PMC 344775. PMID 16593420.
- Tobin, E M; Silverthorne, J (1 June 1985). "Light Regulation of Gene Expression in Higher Plants". Annual Review of Plant Physiology. 36 (1): 569–593. doi:10.1146/annurev.pp.36.060185.003033. ISSN 0066-4294.

== Awards ==
In 2012 she was elected a fellow of the American Association for the Advancement of Science. In 2020 she was given the Leadership in Science Public Service Award by the American Society of Plant Biologists.

== Legacy ==
In 2023 the American Society of Plant Biologists renamed its well-established early career award the Jane Silverthorne Early Career Award in her honour.
