= R. John Ellis =

British plant scientist (born 1935)

- Born: 12 February 1935
- Died: 19 November 2025 (aged 90)
- Education: King's College London
- Awards: Gairdner Foundation International Award (2004)
- Scientific career
- Notable students: Jane Silverthorne, Steven M. Smith

Reginald John Ellis FRS (1935–2025) was a British scientist.

== Early life and education ==
Ellis was educated at Highbury Grammar School, London. He studied at King's College, London and obtained a BSc degree in 1956 and PhD in 1960, for thesis research on the enzymology of transamination. He was supervised by Professor D. D. Davies.

== Career ==
Ellis became scientific officer in the ARC (Agriculture Research Council) Unit of Plant Physiology, Imperial College, University of London, 1959–61 and an ARC Research Fellow at the Department of Biochemistry, University of Oxford, 1961–64, working on the regulation of bacterial sulphate reduction with Professor C. A. Pasternak.

In 1964, Ellis joined the University of Aberdeen as a lecturer in the Department of Botany, and moved to its Department of Biochemistry in 1968, following a visiting professorship in the University of Toronto in 1967.

In 1970, Ellis moved to the newly created Department of Biological Sciences, University of Warwick, as senior lecturer and founding head of the Chloroplast Research Group. Ellis has remained at Warwick University as reader (1973), holder of a personal chair (1976), and emeritus professor (1996). He was a visiting professor at the Department of Chemistry, University of Oxford from 1996 until 2000. From 1990 until 2009, he organised annual meetings of the UK Molecular Chaperone Club at the Universities of Oxford, Cambridge, London, Bristol, Birmingham and Warwick.

Ellis is the author of How Science Works: Evolution.

== Principal research achievements ==
- 1973: First identification of a product of protein synthesis by chloroplast ribosomes.
- 1978: First demonstration of in vitro post-translational protein transport.
- 1980: First demonstration of the binding of a chaperone to a newly synthesised polypeptide.
- 1987: Formulation of the general concept of molecular chaperone function.
- 1988: Discovery of the chaperonins.
- 2000: First demonstration that macromolecular crowding affects protein folding and aggregation.

== Awards ==
- 1980: Tate & Lyle Award for contributions to plant biochemistry.
- 1983: Elected Fellow of the Royal Society of London for contributions to chloroplast biogenesis.
- 1983: Five-year Senior Research Fellowship of the Science and Engineering Research Council to work on chaperone-assisted protein assembly.
- 1986: Elected Member of EMBO, the European Molecular Biology Organisation.
- 1992: Senior Research Fellowship at St John's College, University of Oxford.
- 1997: Appointed Academic Visitor for four years at University of Oxford to work on protein folding with Professor Chris M. Dobson FRS in the Department of Chemistry.
- 2004: Gairdner Foundation International Award for "fundamental discoveries in chaperone-assisted protein folding in the cell and its relevance to neurodegeneration".
- 2007: Cell Stress Society International Medal for "pioneering research on the chaperonins".
- 2011: Croonian Prize Lecture of the Royal Society for "pioneering contributions to biochemistry, molecular biology, and also plant sciences".
- 2018: The 2019 Centenary Award of the Biochemical Society.
