= Biennial bearing =

Term in pomology

Biennial bearing (or alternate) bearing is a term used in pomology to refer to trees that have an irregular crop load from year to year. In the "on" year too much fruit is set, leading to small fruit size. Excess weight in the main branches can be too much for their mechanical resistance, causing them to break. Another major consequence is that flower induction will be lower, and the subsequent year will be "off" year (too little fruit).

The behavior could be due to plant hormones, particularly gibberellins produced in excess in the "on" years in the embryos of the young fruit. It could also be caused by depletion of carbohydrate reserves in the tree.

Biennial bearing is more common in certain fruit crops like mango, apple, pear, apricot and avocado, and is almost nonexistent in grapes.

Biennial bearing is a regular feature of Arabica coffee production in Ethiopia and East Africa, and indeed throughout the coffee-growing world. In Biennial bearing a good or excellent (bumper) crop is followed by a poor, low-yielding crop in the next year's harvest. This phenomenon occurs independently of weather and climate, so that even when climatic conditions are favourable for a good crop, the yield can be poor. There can be a fivefold (x5) difference between on and off years, although in extreme cases there can be a tenfold (x10) difference in Ethiopia and areas of East Africa.

The biennial cropping rhythm is due to the allocation of the plant's resources: in the productive 'on' year, the coffee tree puts its resources into producing the crop at the expense of vegetative growth (stem growth and particularly shoot development and flower bud production); in the 'off' year the plant must make up for this vegetative shortfall, at the expense of flower and fruit production.

Biennial bearing may also be a tree's evolved response to manipulating predator populations that may depress the success of germination as a form of predator satiation, similar to mast years in other plants.

Biennial bearing can be reduced or almost eliminated using various means, including pruning, the addition of fertiliser, controlled irrigation and the use of selected vigorous clones or cultivars.

== Horticultural management ==
This disorder can be reduced by thinning of flowers and young fruit.
