= Flower induction =

Physiological process in the plant

Flower induction is the developmental switch by which the shoot apical meristem of a plant stops producing vegetative structures and begins to produce flowers. The right timing of this switch has a large effect on reproductive success and has been a central concern of plant physiology and crop breeding. In flowering plants, the transition integrates environmental signals - photoperiod, vernalization, ambient temperature, and quality light, with internal cues such as the age of the plant, its sugar status and hormones. These inputs converge on a small number of genes called floral pathway integrators which trigger flowering once their activity rises above a threshold. Arabidopsis thaliana has been serving as the model plant for resolving much of the underlying molecular network of flower-promoting signals.

== Genetic Pathways ==
In A. thaliana, the signals that promote flowering are channelled through several overlapping pathways that converge on a small set of floral pathway integrators which commit the meristem to flowering once their activity passes a threshold:

- FLOWERING LOCUS T (FT): the mobile florigen signal produced in the leaf.
- SUPPRESSOR OF OVERPRESSION OF CONSTANS 1 (SOC1): a MADs-box gene that integrates inputs from the gibberellin, age, and vernalization pathways.
- LEAFY (LFY), together with the floral meristem identity genes APETALA1 (AP1) and CAULIFLOWER (CAL), which lock the meristem into a floral fate.

=== The Age Pathway ===
The age pathway ensures that a plant becomes reproductively competent only after a juvenile vegetative stage. It is controlled by two opposing microRNAs :

- miR156 which is abundant in young plants and represses flowering by degrading floral activators such as SQUAMOSA PROMOTER BINDLING-LIKE (SPLs) transcription factors. As the plant ages, the level of miRNA156 drops, and hence the levels of SPL proteins increase, activating floral regulators such as AP1, LFY, and SOC1.
- miR172 which increases when miR156 drops promotes flowering by degrading repressors such as AP2-like, allowing floral regulators such as FT and SOC1 to turn on and induce flowering.
- Sugar, specifically glucose and sucrose, regulates miR156 by acting as an endogenous cue that reduces its abundance, accelerating the juvenile-to-adult phase transition in plants. Sugar represses miR156 through a two-pronged mechanism: reducing the transcription of MIR156 genes and accelerating the degradation of its primary transcripts, primarily mediated by HEXOKINASE1 (HXK1). Sugars ensure that the plant does not attempt to flower until it has enough carbon energy to support the next generation.

=== The Photoperiod Pathway and Florigen ===
Photoperiodic flowering allows a plant to flower at a favorable time of year. A. thalinana is a facultative long-day plant in which the B-box transcription factor CONSTANS (CO) accumulates in the leaves only when its expression coincides with daylight. CO transcription is controlled by the circadian clock, and CO protein is stabilized by light but degraded in darkness, so the protein accumulates only under long days. Therefore, stabilized CO protein under long days is required for flowering because it then activates the transcription of FT in the leaf.

The product of FT is a small phosphatidylethanolamine-binding protein which moves through the phloem from the leaves to the shoot apex, where it forms a transcription-activating complex with the bZIP transcription factor FD to turn on floral identity genes such as AP1 and SOC1. The transcription of AP1 and SOC1 transform the vegetative meristem into a floral meristem, leading to the activation of the ABCDE genes and the physical development of the flower. FT is therefore widely regarded as a major component of florigen, the movement of which from leaf to shoot apex has been demonstrated in both Arabidopsis and rice. Notably, a closely-related protein, TERMINAL FLOWER 1 (TFL1) competes with FT for binding FD protein, and the TFL1-FD complex blocks flower induction.

=== The Vernalization Pathway ===
Vernalization is the acquisition of competence to flower only after a prolonged period of winter cold. Vernalization ensures that flowering does not take place prematurely before winter has passed, and is a common requirement for winter-annuals. In A. thalinana, the MADS-box transcription factor FLOWERING LOCUS C (FLC) represses FT and SOC1, thus blocking flowering. It works together with related repressor SHORT VEGETATIVE PHASE (SVP), and its expression is increased by the protein FRIGIDA (FRI). During winter, FLC is silenced by two parallel processes:

- The onset of cold triggers the expression of COOLAIR which is the antisense RNA transcribed from the opposite strand of the FLC gene; the transcripts physically interfere with transcription of the sense FLC mRNA, inhibiting the transcription of FLC.
- As the cold persists, VERNALIZATION INSENSITIVE 3 (VIN3) is induced and binds VERNALIZATION 5 (VRN5) to form a complex that guides the Polycomb Repressive Complex 2 PRC2 to modify the chromatin structure surrounding the FLC gene, leaving repressive histone marks (H3K27me3). These marks cluster the Transcription Start Site and Transcription Terminal Site, silencing transcription while the gene is attempting to be read (co-transcriptional). When the weather gets warm, plants stop making VIN3, but FLC must stay repressed. VERNALIZATION 1 (VRN1) recognizes the silenced, methylated state of the FLC locus, and makes sure that the repressive H3K27me3 marks are copied onto the newly synthesized DNA strands in cell division for growth in warmer springs. The histone modification (epigenetics) prevents FLC gene turning back on when weather gets warm. The response of FLC mRNA to cold is gradual as the plant is able to measure how long it has been cold. Once FLC is reduced, plants are free to respond to other signals such as photoperiod; the silenced FLC allows FT to turn on and induce flowering.

=== The Ambient Temperature Pathway ===
Even without vernalization, small changes in ambient temperature can alter flowering. The transcription factor PIF4 activates FT at warmer temperatures, while the MADS-box repressor FLM is subject to temperature-dependent alternative splicing that produces more of an active, flowering-repressing isoform in the cold. The loading and membrane association of FT protein are themselves temperature-sensitive, adding a further layer of thermal regulation.

=== The Gibberellin Pathway ===
Gibberellins promote flowering, especially under short days and in rosette plants, in part by relieving the repression that DELLA proteins exert on the SPL transcription factors. Gibberellin biosynthesis responds to photoperiod and temperature, and the precursor GA12 can act as a long-distance, phloem-mobile signal.

=== The Autonomous Pathway ===
The autonomous pathway promotes flowering independently of the environment - photoperiod or vernalization - by suppressing FLC expression. By silencing or repressing FLC, the plant's flowering genes (like SOC1, LFY, and AP1) can switch on, allowing the plant to transition from vegetative to reproductive growth. The suppression of FLC expression in the autonomous pathway can be achieved through a complex network of proteins and genes, in two parallel mechanisms: 1) RNA processing and polyadenylation and 2) epigenetic modification. Some of its components, such as FCA, are RNA-binding and RNA-processing proteins which act through a transcription-coupled chromatin-silencing mechanism at FLC. FLC is unusually sensitive to the activity of these components because many of them are general regulators of transcription.
