= Circadian rhythm =

Natural internal process that regulates the sleep-wake cycle

Features of the human circadian biological clock based on a person who goes to sleep at 10 p.m.

A circadian rhythm (/sərˈkeɪdiən/), or circadian cycle, is a natural oscillation that repeats roughly every 24 hours. Circadian rhythms can refer to any process that originates within an organism (i.e., endogenous) and responds to the environment (is entrained by the environment). Circadian rhythms are regulated by a circadian clock whose primary function is to rhythmically co-ordinate biological processes so they occur at the correct time to maximize the fitness of an individual. Circadian rhythms have been widely observed in animals, plants, fungi and cyanobacteria and there is evidence that they evolved independently in each of these kingdoms of life.

The term circadian comes from the Latin circa, meaning "around", and dies, meaning "day". Processes with 24-hour cycles are more generally called diurnal rhythms; diurnal rhythms should not be called circadian rhythms unless they can be confirmed as endogenous, and not environmental.

Although circadian rhythms are endogenous, they are adjusted to the local environment by external cues called zeitgebers (from German Zeitgeber (German: [ˈtsaɪtˌɡeːbɐ]; lit. 'time giver')), which include light, temperature and redox cycles. In clinical settings, an abnormal circadian rhythm in humans is known as a circadian rhythm sleep disorder.

== History ==
The earliest recorded account of a circadian process is credited to Theophrastus, dating from the 4th century BC, probably provided to him by report of Androsthenes, a ship's captain serving under Alexander the Great. In his book, 'Περὶ φυτῶν ἱστορία', or 'Enquiry into plants', Theophrastus describes a "tree with many leaves like the rose, and that this closes at night, but opens at sunrise, and by noon is completely unfolded; and at evening again it closes by degrees and remains shut at night, and the natives say that it goes to sleep." The mentioned tree was much later identified as the tamarind tree by the botanist H. Bretzl, in his book on the botanical findings of the Alexandrian campaigns.

The observation of a circadian or diurnal process in humans is mentioned in Chinese medical texts dated to around the 13th century, including the Noon and Midnight Manual and the Mnemonic Rhyme to Aid in the Selection of Acu-points According to the Diurnal Cycle, the Day of the Month and the Season of the Year.

In 1729, French scientist Jean-Jacques d'Ortous de Mairan conducted the first experiment designed to distinguish an endogenous clock from responses to daily stimuli. He noted that 24-hour patterns in the movement of the leaves of the plant Mimosa pudica persisted, even when the plants were kept in constant darkness.

In 1896, Patrick and Gilbert observed that during a prolonged period of sleep deprivation, sleepiness increases and decreases with a period of approximately 24 hours. In 1918, J. S. Szymanski showed that animals are capable of maintaining 24-hour activity patterns in the absence of external cues such as light and changes in temperature.

In the early 20th century, circadian rhythms were noticed in the rhythmic feeding times of bees. Auguste Forel, Ingeborg Beling, and Oskar Wahl conducted numerous experiments to determine whether this rhythm was attributable to an endogenous clock. The existence of circadian rhythm was independently discovered in fruit flies in 1935 by two German zoologists, Hans Kalmus and Erwin Bünning.

In 1954, an important experiment reported by Colin Pittendrigh demonstrated that eclosion (the process of pupa turning into adult) in Drosophila pseudoobscura was a circadian behaviour. He demonstrated that while temperature played a vital role in eclosion rhythm, the period of eclosion was delayed but not stopped when temperature was decreased.

The term circadian was coined by Franz Halberg in 1959. According to Halberg's original definition:

The term "circadian" was derived from circa (about) and dies (day); it may serve to imply that certain physiologic periods are close to 24 hours, if not exactly that length. Herein, "circadian" might be applied to all "24-hour" rhythms, whether or not their periods, individually or on the average, are different from 24 hours, longer or shorter, by a few minutes or hours.

In 1977, the International Committee on Nomenclature of the International Society for Chronobiology formally adopted the definition:

Circadian: relating to biologic variations or rhythms with a frequency of 1 cycle in 24 ± 4 h; circa (about, approximately) and dies (day or 24 h). Note: term describes rhythms with an about 24-h cycle length, whether they are frequency-synchronized with (acceptable) or are desynchronized or free-running from the local environmental time scale, with periods of slightly yet consistently different from 24-h.

Ron Konopka and Seymour Benzer identified the first clock mutation in Drosophila in 1971, naming the gene "period" (per) gene, the first discovered genetic determinant of behavioral rhythmicity. The per gene was isolated in 1984 by two teams of researchers. Konopka, Jeffrey Hall, Michael Roshbash, and their team showed that the per locus is the centre of the circadian rhythm, and that loss of per stops circadian activity. At the same time, Michael W. Young's team reported similar effects of per, and that the gene covers 7.1-kilobase (kb) interval on the X chromosome and encodes a 4.5-kb poly(A)+ RNA. They went on to discover the key genes and neurones in Drosophila circadian system, for which Hall, Rosbash, and Young received the Nobel Prize in Physiology or Medicine 2017.

Joseph Takahashi discovered the first mammalian circadian clock mutation (clockΔ19) using mice in 1994. However, recent studies show that deletion of clock does not lead to a behavioral phenotype (the animals still have normal circadian rhythms), which questions its importance in rhythm generation.

The first human clock mutation was identified in an extended Utah family by Chris Jones, and genetically characterized by Ying-Hui Fu and Louis Ptacek. Affected individuals are extreme 'morning larks' with 4-hour advanced sleep and other rhythms. This form of familial advanced sleep phase syndrome is caused by a single amino acid change, S662➔G, in the human PER2 protein.

== Criteria ==
To be called circadian, a biological rhythm must meet these three general criteria:

1. The rhythm has an endogenously derived free-running period of time that lasts approximately 24 hours. The rhythm persists in constant conditions, i.e. constant darkness, with a period of about 24 hours. The period of the rhythm in constant conditions is called the free-running period and is denoted by the Greek letter τ (tau). The rationale for this criterion is to distinguish circadian rhythms from simple responses to daily external cues. A rhythm cannot be said to be endogenous unless it has been tested and persists in conditions without external periodic input. In diurnal animals (active during daylight hours), in general τ is slightly greater than 24 hours, whereas, in nocturnal animals (active at night), in general τ is shorter than 24 hours.
2. The rhythms are entrainable. The rhythm can be reset by exposure to external stimuli (such as light and heat), a process called entrainment. The external stimulus used to entrain a rhythm is called the zeitgeber, or "time giver". Travel across time zones illustrates the ability of the human biological clock to adjust to the local time; a person will usually experience jet lag before entrainment of their circadian clock has brought it into sync with local time.
3. The rhythms exhibit temperature compensation. In other words, they maintain circadian periodicity over a range of physiological temperatures. Many organisms live at a broad range of temperatures, and differences in thermal energy will affect the kinetics of all molecular processes in their cell(s). In order to keep track of time, the organism's circadian clock must maintain roughly a 24-hour periodicity despite the changing kinetics, a property known as temperature compensation. The Q_{10} temperature coefficient is a measure of this compensating effect. If the Q_{10} coefficient remains approximately 1 as temperature increases, the rhythm is considered to be temperature-compensated.

== Origin ==
Circadian rhythms allow organisms to anticipate and prepare for precise and regular environmental changes. They thus enable organisms to make better use of environmental resources (e.g. light and food) compared to those that cannot predict such availability. It has therefore been suggested that circadian rhythms put organisms at a selective advantage in evolutionary terms. However, rhythmicity appears to be as important in regulating and coordinating internal metabolic processes, as in coordinating with the environment. This is suggested by the maintenance (heritability) of circadian rhythms in fruit flies after several hundred generations in constant laboratory conditions, as well as in creatures in constant darkness in the wild, and by the experimental elimination of behavioral—but not physiological—circadian rhythms in quail.

What drove circadian rhythms to evolve has been an enigmatic question. Previous hypotheses emphasized that photosensitive proteins and circadian rhythms may have originated together in the earliest cells, with the purpose of protecting replicating DNA from high levels of damaging ultraviolet radiation during the daytime. As a result, replication was relegated to the dark. However, evidence for this is lacking: in fact the simplest organisms with a circadian rhythm, the cyanobacteria, do the opposite of this: they divide more in the daytime. Recent studies instead highlight the importance of co-evolution of redox proteins with circadian oscillators in all three domains of life following the Great Oxidation Event approximately 2.3 billion years ago. The current view is that circadian changes in environmental oxygen levels and the production of reactive oxygen species (ROS) in the presence of daylight are likely to have driven a need to evolve circadian rhythms to preempt, and therefore counteract, damaging redox reactions on a daily basis.

The simplest known circadian clocks are bacterial circadian rhythms, exemplified by the prokaryote cyanobacteria. Recent research has demonstrated that the circadian clock of Synechococcus elongatus can be reconstituted in vitro with just the three proteins (KaiA, KaiB, and KaiC) of their central oscillator. This clock has been shown to sustain a 22-hour rhythm over several days upon the addition of ATP. Previous explanations of the prokaryotic circadian timekeeper were dependent upon a DNA transcription/translation feedback mechanism.

A defect in the human homologue of the Drosophila "period" gene was identified as a cause of the sleep disorder FASPS (familial advanced sleep phase syndrome), underscoring the conserved nature of the molecular circadian clock through evolution. Many more genetic components of the biological clock are now known. Their interactions result in an interlocked feedback loop of gene products resulting in periodic fluctuations that the cells of the body interpret as a specific time of the day.

It is now known that the molecular circadian clock can function within a single cell. That is, it is cell-autonomous. This was shown by Gene Block in isolated mollusk basal retinal neurons (BRNs). At the same time, different cells may communicate with each other resulting in a synchronized output of electrical signaling. These may interface with endocrine glands of the brain to result in periodic release of hormones. The receptors for these hormones may be located far across the body and synchronize the peripheral clocks of various organs. Thus, the information of the time of the day as relayed by the eyes travels to the clock in the brain, and, through that, clocks in the rest of the body may be synchronized. This is how the timing of, for example, sleep/wake, body temperature, thirst, and appetite are coordinately controlled by the biological clock.

== Importance in animals ==
Circadian rhythmicity is present in the sleeping and feeding patterns of animals, including human beings. There are also clear patterns of core body temperature, brain wave activity, hormone production, cell regeneration, and other biological activities. In addition, photoperiodism, the physiological reaction of organisms to the length of day or night, is vital to both plants and animals, and the circadian system plays a role in the measurement and interpretation of day length. Timely prediction of seasonal periods of weather conditions, food availability, or predator activity is crucial for survival of many species. Although not the only parameter, the changing length of the photoperiod (day length) is the most predictive environmental cue for the seasonal timing of physiology and behavior, most notably for timing of migration, hibernation, and reproduction.

=== Effect of circadian disruption ===
Mutations or deletions of clock genes in mice have demonstrated the importance of body clocks to ensure the proper timing of cellular/metabolic events; clock-mutant mice are hyperphagic and obese, and have altered glucose metabolism. In mice, deletion of the Rev-ErbA alpha clock gene can result in diet-induced obesity and changes the balance between glucose and lipid utilization, predisposing to diabetes. However, it is not clear whether there is a strong association between clock gene polymorphisms in humans and the susceptibility to develop the metabolic syndrome.

=== Effect of light–dark cycle ===
The rhythm is linked to the light–dark cycle. Animals, including humans, kept in total darkness for extended periods eventually function with a free-running rhythm. Their sleep cycle is pushed back or forward each "day", depending on whether their "day", their endogenous period, is shorter or longer than 24 hours. The environmental cues that reset the rhythms each day are called zeitgebers. Totally blind subterranean mammals (e.g., blind mole rat Spalax sp.) are able to maintain their endogenous clocks in the apparent absence of external stimuli. Although they lack image-forming eyes, their photoreceptors (which detect light) are still functional; they do surface periodically as well.

Free-running organisms that normally have one or two consolidated sleep episodes will still have them when in an environment shielded from external cues, but the rhythm is not entrained to the 24-hour light–dark cycle in nature. The sleep–wake rhythm may, in these circumstances, become out of phase with other circadian or ultradian rhythms such as metabolic, hormonal, CNS electrical, or neurotransmitter rhythms.

Recent research has influenced the design of spacecraft environments, as systems that mimic the light–dark cycle have been found to be highly beneficial to astronauts. Light therapy has been trialed as a treatment for sleep disorders.

=== Arctic animals ===
Norwegian researchers at the University of Tromsø have shown that some Arctic animals (e.g., ptarmigan, reindeer) show circadian rhythms only in the parts of the year that have daily sunrises and sunsets. In one study of reindeer, animals at 70 degrees North showed circadian rhythms in the autumn, winter and spring, but not in the summer. Reindeer on Svalbard at 78 degrees North showed such rhythms only in autumn and spring. The researchers suspect that other Arctic animals as well may not show circadian rhythms in the constant light of summer and the constant dark of winter.

A 2006 study in northern Alaska found that day-living ground squirrels and nocturnal porcupines strictly maintain their circadian rhythms through 82 days and nights of sunshine. The researchers speculate that these two rodents notice that the apparent distance between the sun and the horizon is shortest once a day, and thus have a sufficient signal to entrain (adjust) by.

=== Butterflies and moths ===
The navigation of the fall migration of the Eastern North American monarch butterfly (Danaus plexippus) to their overwintering grounds in central Mexico uses a time-compensated sun compass that depends upon a circadian clock in their antennae. Circadian rhythm is also known to control mating behavior in certain moth species such as Spodoptera littoralis, where females produce a specific pheromone that attracts and resets the male circadian rhythm to induce mating at night.

== Other synchronizers of circadian rhythms ==
Although light is the primary synchronizer of the circadian rhythm through the suprachiasmatic nucleus (SCN), other environmental signals also influence the biological clock. Feeding plays a key role in regulating peripheral clocks found in the liver, muscles, and adipose tissues. Time-restricted feeding can adjust these clocks by modifying light signals. Additionally, physical activity affects the circadian phase, notably by adjusting melatonin production and body temperature. Temperature itself is an important synchronizer, capable of modifying cellular circadian rhythms. Finally, stress and the release of glucocorticoids influence the expression of clock genes, potentially disrupting biological cycles. Integrating these factors is essential for understanding circadian rhythms beyond simple light regulation.

== In plants ==
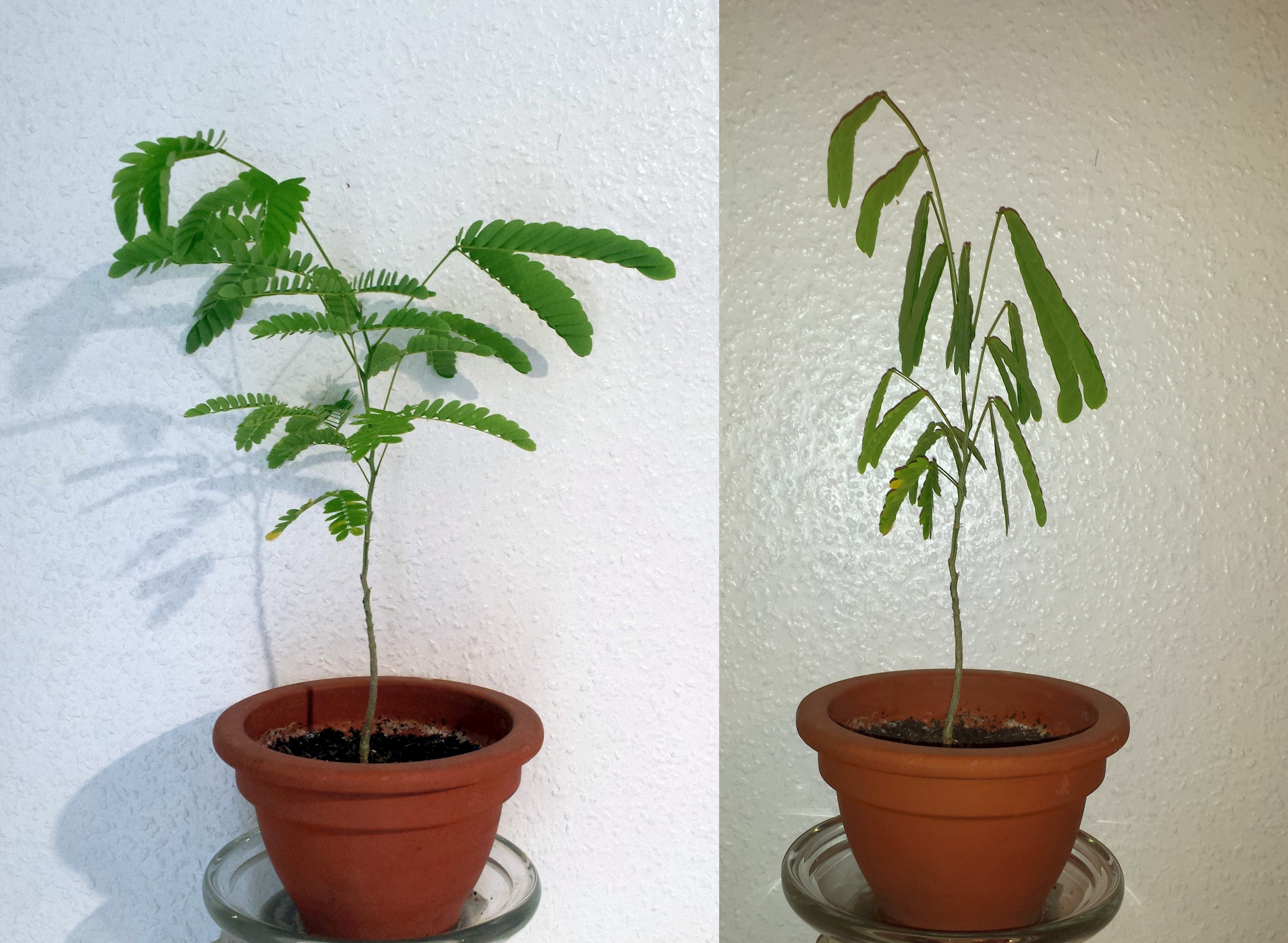
Sleeping tree by day and night

Plant circadian rhythms tell the plant what season it is and when to flower for the best chance of attracting pollinators. Behaviors showing rhythms include leaf movement (nyctinasty), growth, germination, stomatal/gas exchange, enzyme activity, photosynthetic activity, and fragrance emission, among others. Circadian rhythms occur as a plant entrains to synchronize with the light cycle of its surrounding environment. These rhythms are endogenously generated, self-sustaining and are relatively constant over a range of ambient temperatures. Important features include two interacting transcription-translation feedback loops: proteins containing PAS domains, which facilitate protein-protein interactions; and several photoreceptors that fine-tune the clock to different light conditions. Anticipation of changes in the environment allows appropriate changes in a plant's physiological state, conferring an adaptive advantage. A better understanding of plant circadian rhythms has applications in agriculture, such as helping farmers stagger crop harvests to extend crop availability and securing against massive losses due to weather.

Light is the signal by which plants synchronize their internal clocks to their environment and is sensed by a wide variety of photoreceptors. Red and blue light are absorbed through several phytochromes and cryptochromes. Phytochrome A (phyA) is light labile and allows germination and de-etiolation when light is scarce. Phytochromes B–E are more stable with phyB, the main phytochrome in seedlings grown in the light. The cryptochrome (cry) gene is also a light-sensitive component of the circadian clock and is thought to be involved both as a photoreceptor and as part of the clock's endogenous pacemaker mechanism. Cryptochromes 1–2 (involved in blue–UVA) help to maintain the period length in the clock through a whole range of light conditions.

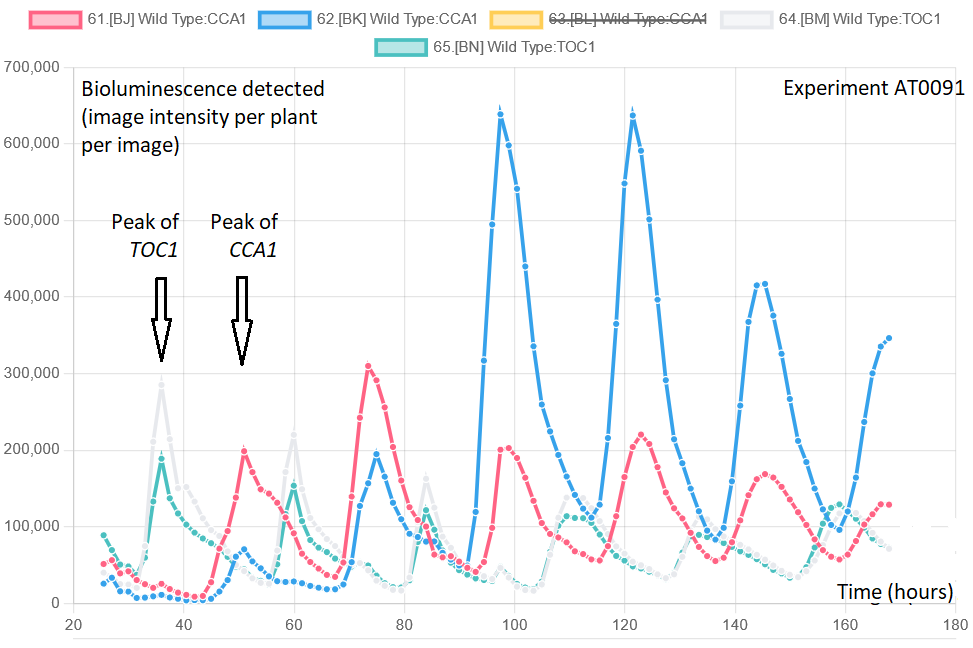
Graph showing timeseries data from bioluminescence imaging of circadian reporter genes. Transgenic seedlings of Arabidopsis thaliana were imaged by a cooled CCD camera under three cycles of 12h light: 12h dark followed by 3 days of constant light (from 96h). Their genomes carry firefly luciferase reporter genes driven by the promoter sequences of clock genes. The signals of seedlings 61 (red) and 62 (blue) reflect transcription of the gene CCA1, peaking after lights-on (48h, 72h, etc.). Seedlings 64 (pale grey) and 65 (teal) reflect TOC1, peaking before lights-off (36h, 60h, etc.). The timeseries show 24-hour, circadian rhythms of gene expression in the living plants.

The central oscillator generates a self-sustaining rhythm and is driven by two interacting feedback loops that are active at different times of day. The morning loop consists of circadian and clock-associated 1 (CCA1) and late elongated hypocotyl (LHY), which encode closely related MYB transcription factors that regulate circadian rhythms in Arabidopsis, as well as pseudo-response regulators PRR7 and PRR9. The evening loop consists of GI (Gigantea) and ELF4, both involved in regulation of flowering time genes. When CCA1 and LHY are overexpressed (under constant light or dark conditions), plants become arrhythmic, and mRNA signals reduce, contributing to a negative feedback loop. Gene expression of CCA1 and LHY oscillates and peaks in the early morning, whereas TOC1 gene expression oscillates and peaks in the early evening. While it was previously hypothesised that these three genes model a negative feedback loop in which over-expressed CCA1 and LHY repress TOC1 and over-expressed TOC1 is a positive regulator of CCA1 and LHY, it was shown in 2012 by Andrew Millar and others that TOC1, in fact, serves as a repressor not only of CCA1, LHY, and PRR7 and 9 in the morning loop but also of GI and ELF4 in the evening loop. This finding and further computational modeling of TOC1 gene functions and interactions suggest a reframing of the plant circadian clock as a triple negative-component repressilator model rather than the positive/negative-element feedback loop characterizing the clock in mammals.

In 2018, researchers found that the expression of PRR5 and TOC1 hnRNA nascent transcripts follows the same oscillatory pattern as processed mRNA transcripts rhythmically in A. thaliana. LNKs binds to the 5'region of PRR5 and TOC1 and interacts with RNAP II and other transcription factors. Moreover, RVE8-LNKs interaction enables a permissive histone-methylation pattern (H3K4me3) to be modified and the histone-modification itself parallels the oscillation of clock gene expression.

It has previously been found that matching a plant's circadian rhythm to its external environment's light and dark cycles has the potential to positively affect the plant. Researchers came to this conclusion by performing experiments on three different varieties of Arabidopsis thaliana. One of these varieties had a normal 24-hour circadian cycle. The other two varieties were mutated, one to have a circadian cycle of more than 27 hours, and one to have a shorter than normal circadian cycle of 20 hours.

The Arabidopsis with the 24-hour circadian cycle was grown in three different environments. One of these environments had a 20-hour light and dark cycle (10 hours of light and 10 hours of dark), the other had a 24-hour light and dark cycle (12 hours of light and 12 hours of dark), and the final environment had a 28-hour light and dark cycle (14 hours of light and 14 hours of dark). The two mutated plants were grown in both an environment that had a 20-hour light and dark cycle and in an environment that had a 28-hour light and dark cycle. It was found that the variety of Arabidopsis with a 24-hour circadian rhythm cycle grew best in an environment that also had a 24-hour light and dark cycle. Overall, it was found that all the varieties of Arabidopsis thaliana had greater levels of chlorophyll and increased growth in environments whose light and dark cycles matched their circadian rhythm.

Researchers suggested that a reason for this could be that matching an Arabidopsis's circadian rhythm to its environment could allow the plant to be better prepared for dawn and dusk, and thus be able to better synchronize its processes. In this study, it was also found that the genes that help to control chlorophyll peaked a few hours after dawn. This appears to be consistent with the proposed phenomenon known as metabolic dawn.

According to the metabolic dawn hypothesis, sugars produced by photosynthesis have potential to help regulate the circadian rhythm and certain photosynthetic and metabolic pathways. As the sun rises, more light becomes available, which normally allows more photosynthesis to occur. The sugars produced by photosynthesis repress PRR7. This repression of PRR7 then leads to the increased expression of CCA1. On the other hand, decreased photosynthetic sugar levels increase PRR7 expression and decrease CCA1 expression. This feedback loop between CCA1 and PRR7 is what is proposed to cause metabolic dawn.

== In Drosophila ==
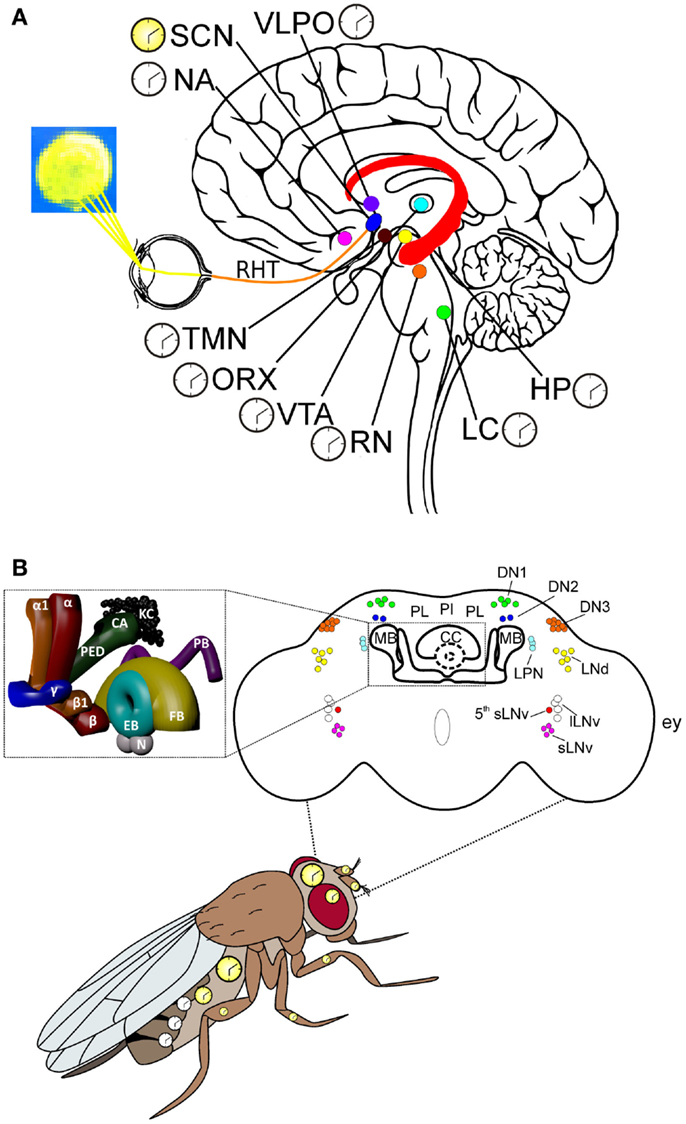
Key centers of the mammalian and Drosophila brains (A) and the circadian system in Drosophila (B)

The molecular mechanism of circadian rhythm and light perception are best understood in Drosophila. Clock genes are discovered from Drosophila, and they act together with the clock neurones. There are two unique rhythms, one during the process of hatching (called eclosion) from the pupa, and the other during mating. The clock neurones are located in distinct clusters in the central brain. The best-understood clock neurones are the large and small lateral ventral neurons (l-LNvs and s-LNvs) of the optic lobe. These neurones produce pigment dispersing factor (PDF), a neuropeptide that acts as a circadian neuromodulator between different clock neurones.

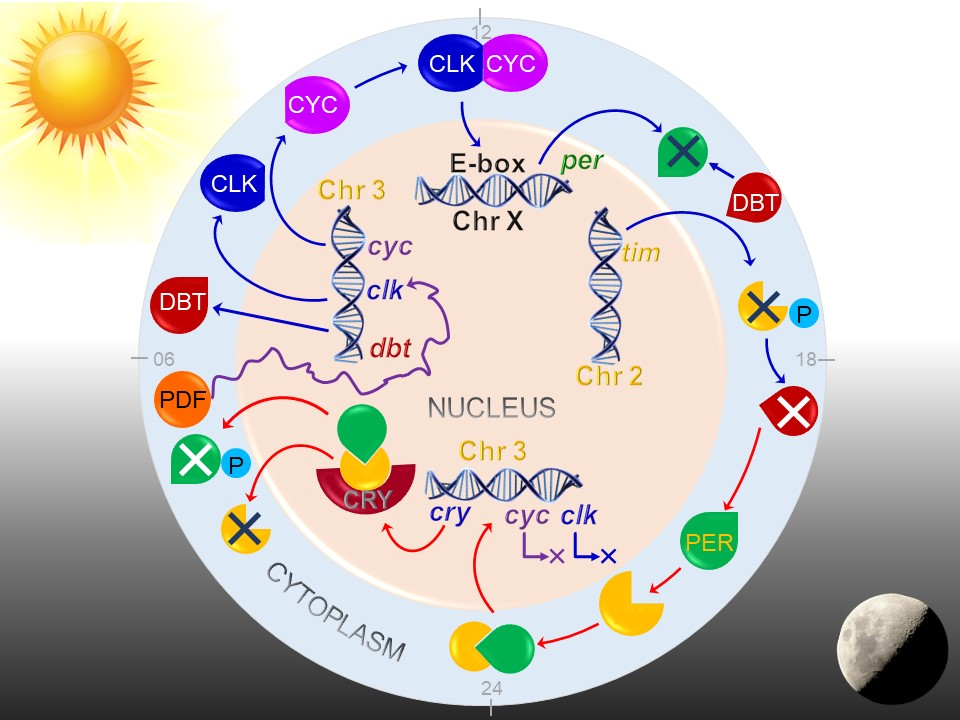
Molecular interactions of clock genes and proteins during Drosophila circadian rhythm

Drosophila circadian rhythm is through a transcription-translation feedback loop. The core clock mechanism consists of two interdependent feedback loops, namely the PER/TIM loop and the CLK/CYC loop. The CLK/CYC loop occurs during the day and initiates the transcription of the per and tim genes. But their protein levels remain low until dusk, because daylight also activates the doubletime (dbt) gene. DBT protein causes phosphorylation and turnover of monomeric PER proteins. TIM is also phosphorylated by shaggy until sunset. After sunset, DBT disappears, so that PER molecules stably bind to TIM. PER/TIM dimer enters the nucleus several at night, and binds to CLK/CYC dimers. Bound PER completely stops the transcriptional activity of CLK and CYC.

In the early morning, light activates the cry gene and its protein CRY causes the breakdown of TIM. Thus PER/TIM dimer dissociates, and the unbound PER becomes unstable. PER undergoes progressive phosphorylation and ultimately degradation. Absence of PER and TIM allows activation of clk and cyc genes. Thus, the clock is reset to start the next circadian cycle.

=== PER-TIM model ===
This protein model was developed based on the oscillations of the PER and TIM proteins in the Drosophila. It is based on its predecessor, the PER model where it was explained how the PER gene and its protein influence the biological clock. The model includes the formation of a nuclear PER-TIM complex which influences the transcription of the PER and the TIM genes (by providing negative feedback) and the multiple phosphorylation of these two proteins. The circadian oscillations of these two proteins seem to synchronise with the light-dark cycle even if they are not necessarily dependent on it. Both PER and TIM proteins are phosphorylated and after they form the PER-TIM nuclear complex they return inside the nucleus to stop the expression of the PER and TIM mRNA. This inhibition lasts as long as the protein, or the mRNA is not degraded. When this happens, the complex releases the inhibition. Here can also be mentioned that the degradation of the TIM protein is sped up by light.

== In mammals ==
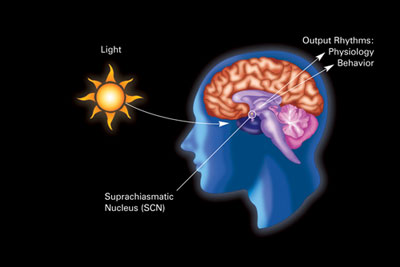
A variation of an eskinogram illustrating the influence of light and darkness on circadian rhythms and related physiology and behavior through the suprachiasmatic nucleus in humans

The primary circadian clock in mammals is located in the suprachiasmatic nucleus (or nuclei) (SCN), a pair of distinct groups of cells located in the hypothalamus. Destruction of the SCN results in the complete absence of a regular sleep–wake rhythm. The SCN receives information about illumination through the eyes. The retina of the eye contains "classical" photoreceptors ("rods" and "cones"), which are used for conventional vision. But the retina also contains specialized ganglion cells that are directly photosensitive, and project directly to the SCN, where they help in the entrainment (synchronization) of this master circadian clock. The proteins involved in the SCN clock are homologous to those found in the fruit fly.

These cells contain the photopigment melanopsin and their signals follow a pathway called the retinohypothalamic tract, leading to the SCN. If cells from the SCN are removed and cultured, they maintain their own rhythm in the absence of external cues.

The SCN takes the information on the lengths of the day and night from the retina, interprets it, and passes it on to the pineal gland, a tiny structure shaped like a pine cone and located on the epithalamus. In response, the pineal secretes the hormone melatonin. Secretion of melatonin peaks at night and ebbs during the day and its presence provides information about night-length.

Several studies have indicated that pineal melatonin feeds back on SCN rhythmicity to modulate circadian patterns of activity and other processes. However, the nature and system-level significance of this feedback are unknown.

The circadian rhythms of humans can be entrained to slightly shorter and longer periods than the Earth's 24 hours. Researchers at Harvard have shown that human subjects can at least be entrained to a 23.5-hour cycle and a 24.65-hour cycle.

=== Humans ===
When eyes receive light from the sun, the pineal gland's production of melatonin is inhibited, and the hormones produced keep the human awake. When the eyes do not receive light, melatonin is produced in the pineal gland and the human becomes tired.

Early research into circadian rhythms suggested that most people preferred a day closer to 25 hours when isolated from external stimuli like daylight and timekeeping. However, this research was faulty because it failed to shield the participants from artificial light. Although subjects were shielded from time cues (like clocks) and daylight, the researchers were not aware of the phase-delaying effects of indoor electric lights. The subjects were allowed to turn on light when they were awake and to turn it off when they wanted to sleep. Electric light in the evening delayed their circadian phase. A more stringent study conducted in 1999 by Harvard University estimated the natural human rhythm to be closer to 24 hours and 11 minutes: much closer to the solar day. Consistent with this research was a more recent study from 2010, which also identified sex differences, with the circadian period for women being slightly shorter (24.09 hours) than for men (24.19 hours). In this study, women tended to wake up earlier than men and exhibit a greater preference for morning activities than men, although the underlying biological mechanisms for these differences are unknown.

Human sleep patterns may also vary with the seasons. A 2026 study followed 456 school students living at moderately high altitude in Mizoram, India, measuring their sleep with questionnaires and wrist actigraphy in March, June, September and December. Sleep timing differed across the four times of year, and boys and girls differed in bedtime, wake time, time in bed and time awake after falling asleep. Students with an evening chronotype reported poorer sleep quality and more daytime sleepiness.

=== Biological markers and effects ===
The classic phase markers for measuring the timing of a mammal's circadian rhythm are:

- melatonin secretion by the pineal gland,
- core body temperature minimum, and
- plasma level of cortisol.

For temperature studies, subjects must remain awake but calm and semi-reclined in near darkness while their rectal temperatures are taken continuously. Though variation is great among normal chronotypes, the average human adult's temperature reaches its minimum at about 5:00 a.m., about two hours before habitual wake time. Baehr et al. found that, in young adults, the daily body temperature minimum occurred at about 04:00 (4 a.m.) for morning types, but at about 06:00 (6 a.m.) for evening types. This minimum occurred at approximately the middle of the eight-hour sleep period for morning types, but closer to waking in evening types.

Melatonin is absent from the system or undetectably low during daytime. Its onset in dim light, dim-light melatonin onset (DLMO), at roughly 21:00 (9 p.m.) can be measured in the blood or the saliva. Its major metabolite can also be measured in morning urine. Both DLMO and the midpoint (in time) of the presence of the hormone in the blood or saliva have been used as circadian markers. However, newer research indicates that the melatonin offset may be the more reliable marker. Benloucif et al. found that melatonin phase markers were more stable and more highly correlated with the timing of sleep than the core temperature minimum. They found that both sleep offset and melatonin offset are more strongly correlated with phase markers than the onset of sleep. In addition, the declining phase of the melatonin levels is more reliable and stable than the termination of melatonin synthesis.

Other physiological changes that occur according to a circadian rhythm include heart rate and many cellular processes "including oxidative stress, cell metabolism, immune and inflammatory responses, epigenetic modification, hypoxia/hyperoxia response pathways, endoplasmic reticular stress, autophagy, and regulation of the stem cell environment." In a study of young men, it was found that the heart rate reaches its lowest average rate during sleep, and its highest average rate shortly after waking.

In contradiction to previous studies, it has been found that there is no effect of body temperature on performance on psychological tests. This is likely due to evolutionary pressures for higher cognitive function compared to the other areas of function examined in previous studies.

=== Outside the "master clock" ===
More-or-less independent circadian rhythms are found in many organs and cells in the body outside the suprachiasmatic nuclei (SCN), the "master clock". Indeed, neuroscientist Joseph Takahashi and colleagues stated in a 2013 article that "almost every cell in the body contains a circadian clock". For example, these clocks, called peripheral oscillators, have been found in the adrenal gland, oesophagus, lungs, liver, pancreas, spleen, thymus, and skin. There is also some evidence that the olfactory bulb and prostate may experience oscillations, at least when cultured.

Though oscillators in the skin respond to light, a systemic influence has not been proven. In addition, many oscillators, such as liver cells, for example, have been shown to respond to inputs other than light, such as feeding.

== Light and the biological clock ==
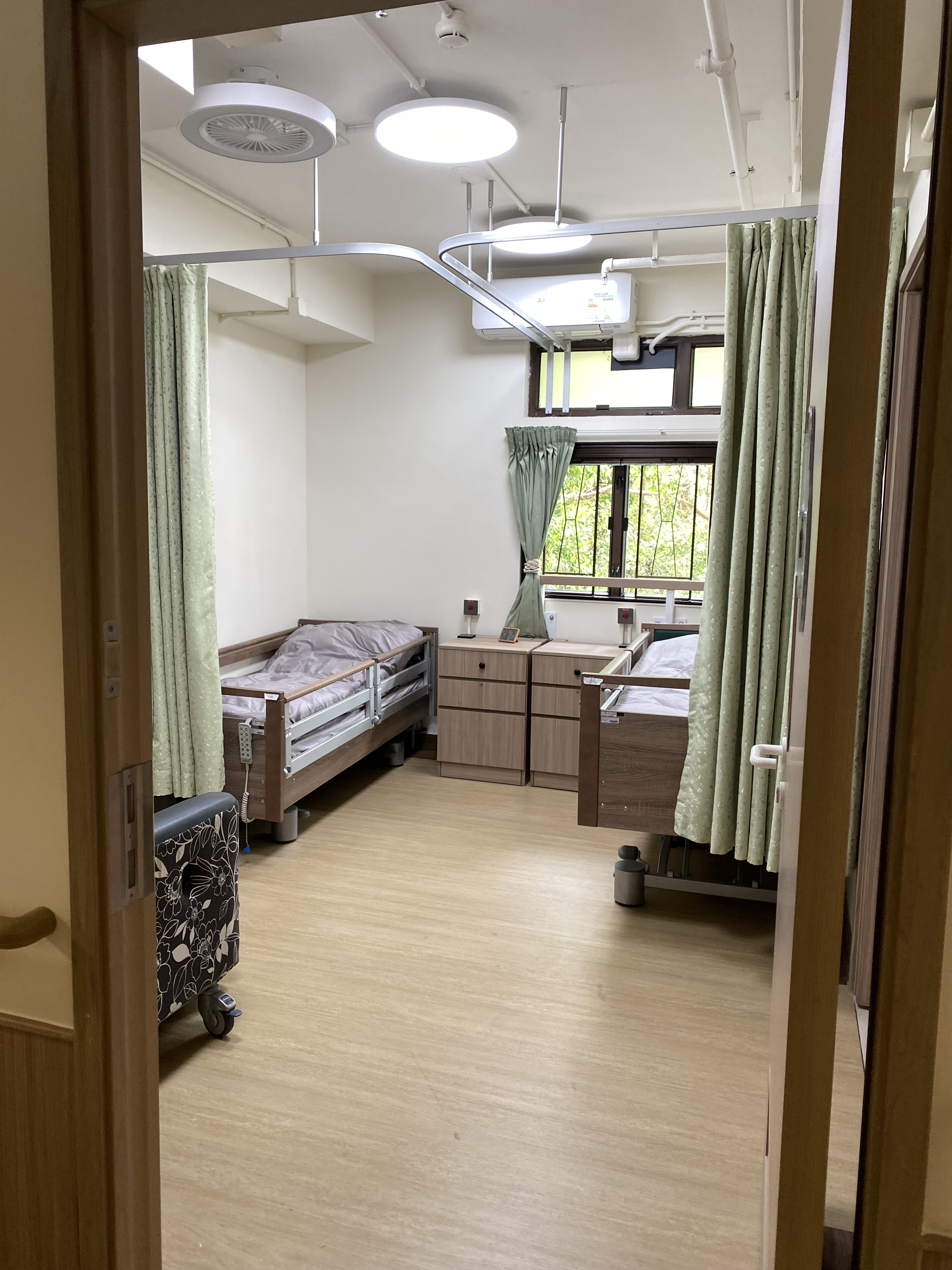
CircadianLux light at the JCCPA that support circadian rhythm indoors

Light resets the biological clock in accordance with the phase response curve (PRC). Depending on the timing, light can advance or delay the circadian rhythm. Both the PRC and the required illuminance vary from species to species, and lower light levels are required to reset the clocks in nocturnal rodents than in humans. Light systems designed to support circadian rhythms, such as the CircadianLux ceiling round, can dynamically adjust lighting levels based on metrics such as melanopic equivalent daylight illuminance (M-EDI), aiming to better support the biological clock. Recent research examined how artificial light and individual differences to light sensitivity can affect human circadian rhythms. A 2023 study found higher melanopic irradiance from electric displays in the evening was associated with higher melatonin suppression and longer sleep latency. This suggests light exposure can influence sleep and circadian rhythms. A 2024 study also found that light sensitivity was associated with circadian timing in summer, but not winter. Researchers looked at the relationship between light sensitivity and circadian rhythms differing depending on depressive symptoms.

== Enforced longer or shorter cycles ==
Various studies on humans have made use of enforced sleep/wake cycles strongly different from 24 hours, such as those conducted by Nathaniel Kleitman in 1938 (28 hours) and Derk-Jan Dijk and Charles Czeisler in the 1990s (20 hours). Because people with a normal (typical) circadian clock cannot entrain to such abnormal day/night rhythms, this is referred to as a forced desynchrony protocol. Under such a protocol, sleep and wake episodes are uncoupled from the body's endogenous circadian period, which allows researchers to assess the effects of circadian phase (i.e., the relative timing of the circadian cycle) on aspects of sleep and wakefulness including sleep latency and other functions - both physiological, behavioral, and cognitive.

Studies also show that Cyclosa turbinata is unique in that its locomotor and web-building activity cause it to have an exceptionally short-period circadian clock, about 19 hours. When C. turbinata spiders are placed into chambers with periods of 19, 24, or 29 hours of evenly split light and dark, none of the spiders exhibited decreased longevity in their own circadian clock. These findings suggest that C. turbinata do not have the same costs of extreme desynchronization as do other species of animals.

== Human health ==
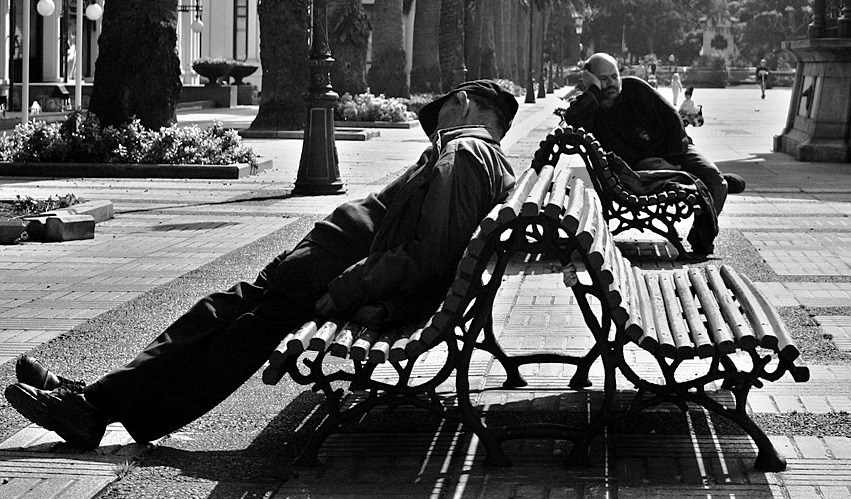
A short nap during the day does not typically affect circadian rhythms.

=== Foundation of circadian medicine ===
The leading edge of circadian biology research is translation of basic body clock mechanisms into clinical tools, and this is relevant to the treatment of cardiovascular disease. Timing of medical treatment in coordination with the body clock, chronotherapeutics, may also benefit patients with hypertension (high blood pressure) by significantly increasing efficacy and reducing drug toxicity or adverse reactions. Drugs targeting the circadian clock mechanism (circadian pharmacology) have been shown experimentally to significantly reduce the damage due to heart attacks and prevent heart failure in rodent models. For rational translation of promising Circadian Medicine therapies to clinical practice, it is imperative that we understand how it helps treat disease in both biological sexes.

=== Causes of disruption to circadian rhythms ===
==== Indoor lighting ====
Lighting requirements for circadian regulation are not simply the same as those for vision; planning of indoor lighting in offices and institutions is beginning to take this into account. Animal studies on the effects of light in laboratory conditions have until recently considered light intensity (irradiance) but not color, which can be shown to "act as an essential regulator of biological timing in more natural settings".

Blue LED lighting suppresses melatonin production five times more than the orange-yellow high-pressure sodium (HPS) light; a metal halide lamp, which is white light, suppresses melatonin at a rate more than three times greater than HPS. Depression symptoms from long term nighttime light exposure can be undone by returning to a normal cycle.

Researchers have also begun to measure the regularity of light exposure, meaning how consistent a person's daily pattern of light is from one day to the next. A 2023 study of 75 adolescents in Melbourne, Australia, used wrist-worn devices to record sleep and light exposure over two weeks of school term and two weeks of vacation, and proposed three new light regularity metrics, including a Light Regularity Index. Adolescents with more regular sleep patterns also had more regular light exposure, and light exposure patterns were more regular during vacation than during the school term.

Exposure to Artificial Lighting

Researchers have found that exposure to outdoor artificial light at night can disrupt one's circadian rhythm. A 2025 study conducted in both Madrid and Toledo, Spain interviewed residents of both cities to attempt to explore the differences in their circadian rhythms and quality of sleep. Researchers found that residents who lived in a city with a high level of artificial lighting, such as Madrid, were more likely to report difficulty falling asleep compared to the residents in Toledo.

==== Airline pilots and cabin crew ====
Due to the nature of work of airline pilots, who often cross several time zones and regions of sunlight and darkness in one day, and spend many hours awake both day and night, they are often unable to maintain sleep patterns that correspond to the natural human circadian rhythm; this situation can easily lead to fatigue. The NTSB cites this as contributing to many accidents, and has conducted several research studies in order to find methods of combating fatigue in pilots.

==== Effect of drugs ====
Studies conducted on both animals and humans show major bidirectional relationships between the circadian system and abusive drugs. It is indicated that these abusive drugs affect the central circadian pacemaker. Individuals with substance use disorder display disrupted rhythms. These disrupted rhythms can increase the risk for substance abuse and relapse. It is possible that genetic and/or environmental disturbances to the normal sleep and wake cycle can increase the susceptibility to addiction.

It is difficult to determine if a disturbance in the circadian rhythm is at fault for an increase in prevalence for substance abuse—or if other environmental factors such as stress are to blame. Changes to the circadian rhythm and sleep occur once an individual begins abusing drugs and alcohol. Once an individual stops using drugs and alcohol, the circadian rhythm continues to be disrupted.

Alcohol consumption disrupts circadian rhythms, with acute intake causing dose-dependent alterations in melatonin and cortisol levels, as well as core body temperature, which normalize the following morning, while chronic alcohol use leads to more severe and persistent disruptions that are associated with alcohol use disorders (AUD) and withdrawal symptoms.

The stabilization of sleep and the circadian rhythm might possibly help to reduce the vulnerability to addiction and reduce the chances of relapse.

Circadian rhythms and clock genes expressed in brain regions outside the suprachiasmatic nucleus may significantly influence the effects produced by drugs such as cocaine. Moreover, genetic manipulations of clock genes profoundly affect cocaine's actions.

=== Consequences of disruption to circadian rhythms ===
==== Disruption ====
Disruption to rhythms usually has a negative effect. Many travelers have experienced the condition known as jet lag, with a number of associated symptoms of fatigue, disorientation, insomnia, indigestion, inability to sleep, appetite loss, irritability, headache, and obesity. Disruption of circadian rhythms decrease melatonin secretion, alters patterns of hormone secretion from the pituitary gland, and enhances oxidative stress that induces neurodegeneration, which can result in a number of psychiatric disorders, such as bipolar disorder, depression, and some sleep disorders such as delayed sleep phase disorder (DSPD), are associated with irregular or pathological functioning of circadian rhythms.

Disruption to rhythms in the longer term is believed to have significant adverse health consequences for peripheral organs outside the brain, in particular in the development or exacerbation of cardiovascular disease.

Studies have shown that maintaining normal sleep and circadian rhythms is important for many aspects of brain and health. A number of studies have also indicated that a power-nap, a short period of sleep during the day, can reduce stress and may improve productivity without any measurable effect on normal circadian rhythms. Circadian rhythms also play a part in the reticular activating system, which is crucial for maintaining a state of consciousness. A reversal in the sleep–wake cycle may be a sign or complication of uremia, azotemia or acute kidney injury. Studies have also helped elucidate how light has a direct effect on human health through its influence on the circadian biology.

==== Relationship with cardiovascular disease ====
One of the first studies to determine how disruption of circadian rhythms causes cardiovascular disease was performed in the Tau hamsters, which have a genetic defect in their circadian clock mechanism. When maintained in a 24-hour light-dark cycle that was "out of sync" with their normal 22 circadian mechanism they developed profound cardiovascular and renal disease; it impacts cardiovascular physiopathology and its function (e.g., heart rate, blood pressure). This impact was studied within shift workers by comparing C-reactive protein and blood pressure levels in two experimental groups. Results showed an increase of 11% in 24h hs-CRP, as well as in systolic and diastolic blood pressure. Disruption of circadian clocks can also be a critical risk factor for hypertension, ischemic stroke, coronary heart disease, or sudden cardiac death. The adverse effects of circadian misalignment on human physiology has been studied in the laboratory using a misalignment protocol, and by studying shift workers. Circadian misalignment is associated with many risk factors of cardiovascular disease. High levels of the atherosclerosis biomarker, resistin, have been reported in shift workers indicating the link between circadian misalignment and plaque build up in arteries. Additionally, elevated triacylglyceride levels (molecules used to store excess fatty acids) were observed and contribute to the hardening of arteries, which is associated with cardiovascular diseases including heart attack, stroke and heart disease. Shift work and the resulting circadian misalignment is also associated with hypertension.

Relationship with Parkinson's disease

Disruption to the circadian rhythm is a common symptom of Parkinson's disease in its early stages. In a 2024 study, researchers studied the potential relationship between circadian rhythm genes and the development of Parkinson's disease. The findings of the study showed that the genes AK3, RTN3, and LEPR were biomarkers for Parkinson's due to their ability to distinguish the Parkinson's group from the control group in the study. This allows future researchers to know which genes to focus on when studying Parkinson's disease and its progression.

Obesity and diabetes

Among factors associated with lifestyle and genetic factors, disruption of the circadian clockwork and/or misalignment of the circadian timing system with the external environment (e.g., light–dark cycle) can play a role in the development of metabolic disorders, such as obesity, diabetes, hyperglycemia, dyslipidemia, and hypertension.

Shift work or chronic jet lag have profound consequences for circadian and metabolic events in the body. Animals that are forced to eat during their resting period show increased body mass and altered expression of clock and metabolic genes. In humans, shift work that favours irregular eating times is associated with altered insulin sensitivity, diabetes and higher body mass.

Eating Disorders

Both sleep and nutrition are two processes that maintain bodies in healthy shape. Researchers have found there to be a connection between eating disorders and poorer sleep along with the disturbance of circadian rhythms.Eating and sleeping habits are known to be regulated by circadian rhythms. When disrupted they can have an effect on eating related behaviors such as eating habits. Which is why researchers have taken a look at a couple of eating disorders that include anorexia nervosa, bulimia nervosa, and binge eating disorder.

These studies have found that individuals with eating disorders reported having previously had sleep disruptions which was often accompanied by daytime sleepiness. Additionally eveningness preference in eating disorder patients further supports the connection of psychopathological conditions and its connection to delayed circadian rhythms.

==== Cognitive effects ====
Circadian misalignment has been associated with reduced cognitive functioning, including decreased alertness, changes in mood, and impaired physical performance. Chronic shift workers have demonstrated higher rates of operational error, impaired visual-motor performance, and processing efficacy which can lead to both a reduction in performance and potential safety issues. Increased risk of dementia is associated with chronic night shift workers compared to day shift workers, particularly for individuals over 50 years old.

Disruptions in sleep-wake cycles have been associated with cognitive impairment and an increased risk of neurodegenerative disorders, including Alzheimer's Disease. Poor sleep quality, fragmented sleep, and reduced sleep efficiency may also contribute to cognitive decline.

Circadian rhythm disruptions may also affect brain functioning, contributing to difficulties with learning and memory. A study examining circadian rhythm in mice found that disrupted sleep cycles were associated with increased amyloid-beta accumulation in the hippocampus, a brain region that is important to memory and learning. The study also identified reduced levels of brain-derived neurotrophic factor, a protein that supports neural functioning and memory.

==== Sex differences ====
Studies on the differences in circadian rhythm between the sexes have indicated that women may have earlier circadian timing, with light conditions as a possible factor. Disruptions in circadian rhythms in females may increase the odds of menstrual cycle disruption and infertility, while in males, the disruption in circadian rhythm may lead to decreased semen quality.

Additional research has found that women who have a prolonged disruption of circadian misalignment are greatly affected in other areas. There has also been a connection between circadian misalignment and metabolic disorders or metabolic control. Women are more likely then men to develop insomnia which is has an overlapping relationship with circadian rhythms. Research has found that women have reported their sleep quality as poorer and they have also been found to have a heightened risk of developing metabolic syndrome.

== Society and culture ==
In 2017, Jeffrey C. Hall, Michael W. Young, and Michael Rosbash were awarded Nobel Prize in Physiology or Medicine "for their discoveries of molecular mechanisms controlling the circadian rhythm".

Circadian rhythms was taken as an example of scientific knowledge being transferred into the public sphere.

== See also ==
- Actigraphy (also known as actimetry)
- ARNTL
- ARNTL2
- Bacterial circadian rhythms
- Circadian rhythm sleep disorders, such as
  - Advanced sleep phase disorder
  - Delayed sleep phase disorder
  - Non-24-hour Sleep-Wake Rhythm Disorder
- Chronobiology
- Chronodisruption
- CLOCK
- Circasemidian rhythm
- Circaseptan, 7-day biological cycle
- CRY1 and CRY2: the cryptochrome family genes
- Diurnal cycle
- Infradian rhythm
- Light effects on circadian rhythm
- Light in school buildings
- PER1, PER2, and PER3: the period family genes
- Photosensitive ganglion cell: part of the eye which is involved in regulating circadian rhythm.
- Polyphasic sleep
- Segmented sleep
- Sleep architecture (sleep in humans)
- Sleep in non-human animals
- Stefania Follini
- Ultradian rhythm
