= Late Elongated Hypocotyl =

Oscillating gene found in plants

The Late Elongated Hypocotyl gene (LHY), is an oscillating gene found in plants that functions as part of their circadian clock. LHY encodes components of mutually regulatory negative feedback loops with Circadian Clock Associated 1 (CCA1) in which overexpression of either results in dampening of both of their expression. This negative feedback loop affects the rhythmicity of multiple outputs creating a daytime protein complex. LHY was one of the first genes identified in the plant clock, along with TOC1 and CCA1. LHY and CCA1 have similar patterns of expression, which is capable of being induced by light. Single loss-of-function mutants in both genes result in seemingly identical phenotypes, but LHY cannot fully rescue the rhythm when CCA1 is absent, indicating that they may only be partially functionally redundant. Under constant light conditions, CCA1 and LHY double loss-of-function mutants fail to maintain rhythms in clock-controlled RNAs.

The circadian clock in plants has completely different components to those in the animal, fungus or bacterial clocks. The plant clock does have a conceptual similarity to the animal clock in that it consists of a series of interlocking transcriptional feedback loops. The genes involved in the clock show their peak expression at a fixed time of day. The peak expression of the CCA1 and LHY genes occurs at dawn, and the peak expression of the TOC1 gene occurs roughly at dusk. CCA1/LHY and TOC1 proteins repress the expression of each other's genes. The result is that as CCA1/LHY protein levels start to reduce after dawn, it releases the repression on the TOC1 gene, allowing TOC1 expression and TOC1 protein levels to increase. As TOC1 protein levels increase, it further suppresses the expression of the CCA1 and LHY genes. The opposite of this sequence occurs overnight to re-establish the peak expression of CCA1 and LHY genes at dawn.

CCA1 is generally a more significant component of this oscillator. Light induces its transcription, and mRNA levels peak at dawn along with LHY. CCA1 and LHY associate to inhibit transcription of the Evening Complex (EC) proteins: ELF4, ELF3 and LUX, which suppresses their accumulation until dusk when LHY and CCA1 protein levels are at their lowest. Four primary pseudo-response regulator proteins (PRR9, PRR7, PRR5 and TOC1/PRR1) perform the majority of interactions with other proteins within the circadian oscillator, and another (PRR3) that has limited function. These genes are all paralogs of each other, and all repress the transcription of CCA1 and LHY at various times throughout the day.

Plants that have lost function of LHY and CCA1 lose the ability to stably maintain circadian rhythm and other output phenomena. In one study, such plants showed photoperiod- insensitive early flowering under long- day (16 hours of light/ 8 hours of dark) conditions and short day (8 hours of light, 16 hours of dark conditions), and arrhythmicity under constant light conditions. However they retain some circadian function in light/dark cycles, showing that Arabidopsis circadian clock is not completely dependent on CCA1 and LHY activity. Plants with non-functioning LHY and CCA1 show a wavy leaf phenotype in constant light conditions. Mutants also have increased vascular pattern complexity in their leaves, with more areoles, branch points and free ends than wild-type Arabidopsis.

The function of LHY was initially identified as a dominant late flowering transposon-tagged mutant in the Coupland lab of the John Innes center (UK)
