= Expression cloning =

Expression cloning is a technique in DNA cloning that uses expression vectors to generate a library of clones, with each clone expressing one protein. This expression library is then screened for the property of interest and clones of interest are recovered for further analysis. An example would be using an expression library to isolate genes that could confer antibiotic resistance.

== Expression vectors ==
Expression vectors are a specialized type of cloning vector in which the transcriptional and translational signals needed for the regulation of the gene of interest are included in the cloning vector. The transcriptional and translational signals may be synthetically created to make the expression of the gene of interest easier to regulate.

== Purpose ==
Usually the ultimate aim of expression cloning is to produce large quantities of specific proteins. To this end, a bacterial expression clone may include a ribosome binding site (Shine-Dalgarno sequence) to enhance translation of the gene of interest's mRNA, a transcription termination sequence, or, in eukaryotes, specific sequences to promote the post-translational modification of the protein product.

== See also ==
- Molecular cell biology
- genetics
- gene expression
- Transcription (genetics)
- translation
- λ phage
- pBR322
