= TOC1 (gene) =

Gene that regulates circadian rhythm in plants

Timing of CAB Expression 1

Identifiers
- Organism: Arabidopsis thaliana
- Symbol: APRR1
- Alt. symbols: TOC1, AtTOC1, MFB13.13, PSEUDO-RESPONSE REGULATOR 1
- Entrez: 836259
- RefSeq (mRNA): NM_125531.3
- RefSeq (Prot): NP_200946.1
- UniProt: Q9LKL2

Other data
- Chromosome: 5: 24.69 - 24.7 Mb
Search for
- Structures: Swiss-model
- Domains: InterPro

toc1
Gene
Number of Exons	6
Number of Introns	5
Size	3.49 kb
mRNA
size	2713 bp
Protein
Molecular Weight	69.2 kDa
pI	7.5
Amino Acids	618
Location in Arabidopsis
Chromosome	5
Distance	79.0 cM
Locus Tag	AT5G61380

Timing of CAB expression 1 is a protein that in Arabidopsis thaliana is encoded by the TOC1 gene. TOC1 is also known as two-component response regulator-like APRR1.

TOC1 was the first plant gene that, when mutated, yielded a circadian phenotype. It codes for the transcription factor TOC1, which affects the period of plants' circadian rhythms: built-in, malleable oscillations that repeat every 24 hours. The gene codes for a transcriptional repressor, TOC1, one of five pseudo-response regulators (PRR) that mediate the period of the circadian clock in plants. The TOC1 protein is involved in the clock's evening loop, which is a repressilator that directly inhibits transcription of morning loop genes LHY and CCA1. Toc1 gene is expressed in most plant structures and cells, and has its locus on chromosome 5.

== Historical context ==
=== Discovery ===
The TOC1 gene was initially discovered by Prof. Andrew Millar and colleagues in 1995 while Millar was a graduate student. Millar developed an innovative forward genetic screen in which he linked a bioluminescent reporter, firefly (luciferase), to expression of CAB (chlorophyll-a,b binding protein—see Light-harvesting complexes of green plants) in Arabidopsis. By measuring bioluminescence over the course of the day, Millar found CAB expression to display oscillatory patterns in constant light and to oscillate with a shorter period in toc1 mutant plants. He also mapped the toc1 gene to chromosome 5. These methods and discoveries were published in and featured on the cover of Science magazine in February 1995.

Partially because the initial studies of clock genes were conducted in Drosophila in the 1970s and then in mammals, it was originally thought that the plant circadian clock functioned similarly to the mammalian clock. In mammals, positive and negative regulatory elements act in feedback loops to drive circadian oscillations; namely, Per and Cry genes are activated by positive elements CLOCK and BMAL to produce proteins that, when phosphorylated, act as negative elements to inhibit the CLOCK:BMAL complex from its activating function. In this way, Per and Cry inhibit their own transcription.

In contrast, Millar's group found the TOC1 protein to be a negative regulator, and the plant clock to be better modeled as a repressilator—a system in which one gene represses another and is in turn repressed by the next, forming an interdependent, oscillating gene network. This finding was achieved through 1) Arabidopsis mutants with constitutive (always turned on) toc1 gene expression, which showed decreased mRNA abundance in both morning loop genes prr7 and 9, cca1, and lhy and evening loop genes gi and elf4; and 2) plants with mutations in toc1 and plants in which RNAi was used to knock out toc1. These mutants with no functional toc1 showed an advanced phase for lhy, suggesting less repression in the absence of TOC1 protein.

A study by Carl Strayer and colleagues found that toc1 gene's transcriptional involvement shortened circadian rhythms in constant dark in addition to constant light, and that TOC1 was circadianly regulated and involved in regulation of its own feedback loop.

=== Evolutionary History ===
- Homologs

Homologs of TOC1 have been found in lyrate rockcress, Brassica, papaya, cucumber, strawberry, soybean, lotus, apple, peach, western poplar (populus), castor bean, tomato, potato, grape vine, and chickpea.

- Polymorphisms

21 polymorphisms have been found in Arabidopsis, including substitutions, insertions, and deletions.

== Protein characteristics ==
=== Structural motifs ===
Like the other four PRR proteins found in Arabidopsis, TOC1 is located in the nucleus and employs a pseudo-receiver (PR) domain in the N-terminus and a CONSTANS, CONSTANS-LIKE, and TOC1 (CCT) domain at the C-terminus. Through its CCT domain, TOC1 is able to directly bind DNA, and the PR domain is responsible for transcriptional repression activity.

=== Functions and interactions ===
TOC1 binds to the G-box and EE-motif promoter regions of genes involved in both the morning and evening transcription-translation feedback loops that drive the plant circadian clock; these genes include PRR7 and 9, CCA1, and LHY in the morning feedback loop and GI and ELF4 in the evening loop. Discrete induction of TOC1 gene expression results in reduced CCA1 and PRR9 expression, indicating that TOC1 plays a repressive rather than stimulatory role in regulating circadian gene expression. Repression of morning loop genes lhy and cca1 was predicted by computational modeling and was the piece of evidence needed to re-define toc1's role in the plant clock as part of a triple negative-component repressilator model rather than a positive/negative-element system of the sort seen in mammals.

The binding pattern of TOC1's CCT domain exhibits circadian oscillations, with maximum binding to G-box and EE motifs—promoter regions that bind transcription factors—occurring at CT15 in the plant's early subjective night. It was shown through the loss of binding rhythms in Arabidopsis mutants with constitutive TOC1 expression that oscillations in TOC1 binding are regulated by the protein's abundance.

TOC1 also appears to be involved in a feedback loop with abscisic acid, a key plant hormone involved in development and stress response. Arabidopsis plants to which varying amounts of ABA were applied showed corresponding differences in TOC1 expression and in circadian period length. Through computational modeling of this feedback loop, TOC1 was shown to be a clock-based influence on patterns of stoma opening and closure, which has traditionally been described as a mainly ABA-regulated process.

=== Post-translational modifications ===
Over the circadian cycle, TOC1 is differentially phosphorylated, with peak phosphorylation occurring during the night. In the highly phosphorylated state, TOC1 has a higher binding affinity to the F-box protein ZEITLUPE (ZTL). In addition to controlling TOC1 - ZTL interactions, phosphorylation of the N-terminus of TOC1 protein increases interaction with PRR3, one of the five PRR proteins found in Arabidopsis. From studies with ztl-1 mutants, which have a single missense mutation in the kelch domain of the protein and effectively cause a ztl null mutation, TOC1 protein has been found to be stabilized and TOC1 cycling largely eliminated. While phosphorylation of TOC1 protein stabilizes interactions with ZTL, it also increases TOC1's affinity for PRR3. This ultimately protects TOC1 from ZTL-mediated degradation. PRR3 acts as a competitive inhibitor for the ZTL-TOC1 interaction, as binding of TOC1 to PRR3 results in decreased TOC1 substrate availability for ZTL-dependent degradation. This results in an enhanced amplitude of TOC1 cycling, implying that stable TOC1 cycling is dependent upon ZTL degradation in addition to transcriptional regulation controls.

== Agricultural use ==
To most efficiently use environmental resources such as light, plants generally synchronize their circadian rhythms to match the period of the environment. In a study published in 2005, it was shown that plants whose circadian period matched the period of the light-dark cycle in its environment had increased photosynthesis and growth. Using this knowledge, botanists can take advantage of a mutation in the toc1 gene that has been shown to decrease the period of a plant. It is plausible that these toc1 mutants can easily be used to produce plants in a shorter amount of time, with a smaller amount of energy.
