= Circadian clock =

Biological mechanism that controls circadian rhythm

A circadian clock, or circadian oscillator, also known as one's internal alarm clock, is a biochemical oscillator that cycles with a stable phase and is synchronized with solar time.

Such a clock's in vivo period is necessarily almost exactly 24 hours (the earth's current solar day). In most living organisms, internally synchronized circadian clocks make it possible for the organism to anticipate daily environmental changes corresponding with the day–night cycle and adjust its biology and behavior accordingly.

The term circadian derives from the Latin circa (about) dies (a day), since when taken away from external cues (such as environmental light), they do not run to exactly 24 hours. Clocks in humans in a lab in constant low light, for example, will average about 24.2 hours per day, rather than 24 hours exactly.

The normal body clock oscillates with an endogenous period of exactly 24 hours, it entrains, when it receives sufficient daily corrective signals from the environment, primarily daylight and darkness. Circadian clocks are the central mechanisms that drive circadian rhythms. They consist of three major components:

- a central biochemical oscillator with a period of about 24 hours that keeps time;
- a series of input pathways to this central oscillator to allow entrainment of the clock;
- a series of output pathways tied to distinct phases of the oscillator that regulate overt rhythms in biochemistry, physiology, and behavior throughout an organism.

The clock is reset as an organism senses environmental time cues of which the primary one is light. Circadian oscillators are ubiquitous in tissues of the body where they are synchronized by both endogenous and external signals to regulate transcriptional activity throughout the day in a tissue-specific manner. The circadian clock is intertwined with most cellular metabolic processes and it is affected by organism aging. The basic molecular mechanisms of the biological clock have been defined in vertebrate species, Drosophila melanogaster, plants, fungi, bacteria, and presumably also in Archaea.

In 2017, the Nobel Prize in Physiology or Medicine was awarded to Jeffrey C. Hall, Michael Rosbash and Michael W. Young "for their discoveries of molecular mechanisms controlling the circadian rhythm" in fruit flies.

== Vertebrate anatomy ==
In vertebrates, the master circadian clock is contained within the suprachiasmatic nucleus (SCN), a bilateral nerve cluster of about 20,000 neurons. The SCN itself is located in the hypothalamus, a small region of the brain situated directly above the optic chiasm, where it receives input from specialized photosensitive ganglion cells in the retina via the retinohypothalamic tract.

The SCN maintains control across the body by synchronizing "slave oscillators", which exhibit their own near-24-hour rhythms and control circadian phenomena in local tissue. Through intercellular signalling mechanisms such as vasoactive intestinal peptide, the SCN signals other hypothalamic nuclei and the pineal gland to modulate body temperature and production of hormones such as cortisol and melatonin; these hormones enter the circulatory system, and induce clock-driven effects throughout the organism.

It is not, however, clear precisely what signal (or signals) enacts principal entrainment to the many biochemical clocks contained in tissues throughout the body. See section "regulation of circadian oscillators" below for more details.

== Transcriptional and non-transcriptional control ==
Evidence for a genetic basis of circadian rhythms in higher eukaryotes began with the discovery of the period (per) locus in Drosophila melanogaster from forward genetic screens completed by Ron Konopka and Seymour Benzer in 1971. Through the analysis of per circadian mutants and additional mutations on Drosophila clock genes, a model encompassing positive and negative autoregulatory feedback loops of transcription and translation has been proposed. Core circadian 'clock' genes are defined as genes whose protein products are necessary components for the generation and regulation of circadian rhythms. Similar models have been suggested in mammals and other organisms.

Studies in cyanobacteria, however, changed our view of the clock mechanism, since it was found by Kondo and colleagues that these single-cell organisms could maintain accurate 24-hour timing in the absence of transcription, i.e. there was no requirement for a transcription-translation autoregulatory feedback loop for rhythms. Moreover, this clock was reconstructed in a test tube (i.e., in the absence of any cell components), proving that accurate 24-hour clocks can be formed without the need for genetic feedback circuits. However, this mechanism was only applicable to cyanobacteria and not generic.

In 2011, a major breakthrough in understanding came from the Reddy laboratory at the University of Cambridge. This group discovered circadian rhythms in redox proteins (peroxiredoxins) in cells that lacked a nucleus – human red blood cells. In these cells, there was no transcription or genetic circuits, and therefore no feedback loop. Similar observations were made in a marine alga and subsequently in mouse red blood cells. More importantly, redox oscillations as demonstrated by peroxiredoxin rhythms have now been seen in multiple distant kingdoms of life (eukaryotes, bacteria and archaea), covering the evolutionary tree. Therefore, redox clocks look to be the grandfather clock, and genetic feedback circuits the major output mechanisms to control cell and tissue physiology and behavior.

Therefore, the model of the clock has to be considered as a product of an interaction between both transcriptional circuits and non-transcriptional elements such as redox oscillations and protein phosphorylation cycles.

=== Mammalian clocks ===
Selective gene knockdown of known components of the human circadian clock demonstrates both active compensatory mechanisms and redundancy are used to maintain function of the clock. Several mammalian clock genes have been identified and characterized through experiments on animals harboring naturally occurring, chemically induced, and targeted knockout mutations, and various comparative genomic approaches.

The majority of identified clock components are transcriptional activators or repressors that modulate protein stability and nuclear translocation and create two interlocking feedback loops. In the primary feedback loop, members of the basic helix-loop-helix (bHLH)-PAS (Period-Arnt-Single-minded) transcription factor family, CLOCK and BMAL1, heterodimerize in the cytoplasm to form a complex that, following translocation to the nucleus, initiates transcription of target genes such as the core clock genes 'period' genes (PER1, PER2, and PER3) and two cryptochrome genes (CRY1 and CRY2). Negative feedback is achieved by PER:CRY heterodimers that translocate back to the nucleus to repress their own transcription by inhibiting the activity of the CLOCK:BMAL1 complexes. Another regulatory loop is induced when CLOCK:BMAL1 heterodimers activate the transcription of Rev-ErbA and Rora, two retinoic acid-related orphan nuclear receptors. REV-ERBa and RORa subsequently compete to bind Retinoid-related orphan receptor response element|retinoic acid-related orphan receptor response elements (ROREs) present in Bmal1 promoter. Through the subsequent binding of ROREs, members of ROR and REV-ERB are able to regulate Bmal1. While RORs activate transcription of Bmal1, REV-ERBs repress the same transcription process. Hence, the circadian oscillation of Bmal1 is both positively and negatively regulated by RORs and REV-ERBs.

=== Insect clocks ===
In D. melanogaster, the gene cycle (CYC) is the ortholog of BMAL1 in mammals. Thus, CLOCK–CYC dimers activate the transcription of circadian genes. The gene timeless (TIM) is the orthologue for mammalian CRYs as the inhibitor; D. melanogaster CRY functions as a photoreceptor instead. In flies, CLK–CYC binds to the promoters of circadian-regulated genes only at the time of transcription. A stabilizing loop also exists where the gene vrille (VRI) inhibits whereas PAR-domain protein-1 (PDP1) activates Clock transcription.

=== Fungal clocks ===
In the filamentous fungus N. crassa, the clock mechanism is analogous, but non-orthologous, to that of mammals and flies.

=== Plant clocks ===
The circadian clock in plants has completely different components to those in the animal, fungus, or bacterial clocks. The plant clock does have a conceptual similarity to the animal clock in that it consists of a series of interlocking transcriptional feedback loops. The genes involved in the clock show their peak expression at a fixed time of day. The first genes identified in the plant clock were TOC1, CCA1 and LHY. The peak expression of the CCA1 and LHY genes occurs at dawn, and the peak expression of the TOC1 gene occurs roughly at dusk. CCA1/LHY and TOC1 proteins repress the expression of each other's genes. The result is that as CCA1/LHY protein levels start to reduce after dawn, it releases the repression on the TOC1 gene, allowing TOC1 expression and TOC1 protein levels to increase. As TOC1 protein levels increase, it further suppresses the expression of the CCA1 and LHY genes. The opposite of this sequence occurs overnight to re-establish the peak expression of CCA1 and LHY genes at dawn. There is much more complexity built into the clock, with multiple loops involving the PRR genes, the Evening Complex and the light sensitive GIGANTIA and ZEITLUPE proteins.

=== Bacterial clocks ===
In bacterial circadian rhythms, the oscillations of the phosphorylation of cyanobacterial Kai C protein was reconstituted in a cell free system (an in vitro clock) by incubating KaiC with KaiA, KaiB, and ATP.

== Post-transcriptional modification ==
For a long time, it was thought the transcriptional activation/repression cycles driven by the transcriptional regulators constituting the circadian clock was the main driving force for circadian gene expression in mammals. More recently, however, it was reported that only 22% of messenger RNA cycling genes are driven by de novo transcription. RNA-level post-transcriptional mechanisms driving rhythmic protein expression were later reported, such as mRNA polyadenylation dynamics.

Fustin and co-workers identified methylation of internal adenosines (m^{6}A) within mRNA (notably of clock transcripts themselves) as a key regulator of the circadian period. Inhibition of m^{6}A methylation via pharmacological inhibition of cellular methylations or more specifically by siRNA-mediated silencing of the m^{6}A methylase Mettl3 led to the dramatic elongation of the circadian period. In contrast, overexpression of Mettl3 in vitro led to a shorter period. These observations clearly demonstrated the importance of RNA-level post-transcriptional regulation of the circadian clock, and concurrently established the physiological role of (m^{6}A) RNA methylation.

== Post-translational modification ==
The autoregulatory feedback loops in clocks take about 24 hours to complete a cycle and constitute a circadian molecular clock. This generation of the ~24-hour molecular clock is governed by post-translational modifications such as phosphorylation, sumoylation, histone acetylation and methylation, and ubiquitination. Reversible phosphorylation regulates important processes such as nuclear entry, formation of protein complexes and protein degradation. Each of these processes significantly contributes to keeping the period at ~24 hours and lends the precision of a circadian clock by affecting the stability of the aforementioned core clock proteins. Thus, while transcriptional regulation generates rhythmic RNA levels, regulated posttranslational modifications control protein abundance, subcellular localization, and repressor activity of PER and CRY.

Proteins responsible for post-translational modification of clock genes include casein kinase family members (casein kinase 1 delta (CSNK1D) and casein kinase 1 epsilon (CSNK1E) and the F-box leucine-rich repeat protein 3 (FBXL3). In mammals, CSNK1E and CSNK1D are critical factors that regulate the core circadian protein turnover. Experimental manipulation on either of these proteins results in dramatic effects on circadian periods, such as altered kinase activities and cause shorter circadian periods, and further demonstrates the importance of the post-translational regulation within the core mechanism of the circadian clock. These mutations have become of particular interest in humans as they are implicated in the advanced sleep phase disorder. A small ubiquitin-related modifier protein modification of BMAL1 has also been proposed as another level of post-translational regulation.

== Regulation of circadian oscillators ==
Circadian oscillators are simply oscillators with a period of approximately 24 hours. In response to light stimulus, the body corresponds with a system and network of pathways that work together to determine the biological day and night. The regulatory networks involved in keeping the clock precise span over a range of post-translation regulation mechanisms. Circadian oscillators may be regulated by phosphorylation, SUMOylation, ubiquitination, and histone acetylation and deacetylation, the covalent modification of the histone tail which controls the level of chromatin structures causing the gene to be expressed more readily. Methylation of a protein structure adds a methyl group and regulates the protein function or gene expression and in histone methylation gene expression is either suppressed or activated by changing the DNA sequence. Histones go through an acetylation, methylation and phosphorylation process but the major structural and chemical changes happen when enzymes histone acetyltransferases (HAT) and histone deacetylases (HDAC) add or remove acetyl groups from the histone causing a major change in DNA expression. By changing DNA expression, histone acetylation and methylation regulate how the circadian oscillator operates. Fustin and co-workers provided a new layer of complexity to the regulation of circadian oscillator in mammals by showing that RNA methylation was necessary for efficient export of mature mRNA out of the nucleus: inhibition of RNA methylation caused nuclear retention of clock gene transcripts, leading to a longer circadian period.

A key feature of clocks is their ability to synchronize to external stimuli. The presence of cell-autonomous oscillators in almost every cell in the body raises the question of how these oscillators are temporally coordinated. The quest for universal timing cues for peripheral clocks in mammals has yielded principal entrainment signals such as feeding, temperature, and oxygen. Both feeding rhythms and temperature cycles were shown to synchronize peripheral clocks and even uncouple them from the master clock in the brain (e.g., daytime restricted feeding). Oxygen rhythms have also been found to synchronize clocks in cultured cells.

== Systems biology approaches to elucidate oscillating mechanisms ==
Modern experimental approaches using systems biology have identified many novel components in biological clocks that suggest an integrative view on how organisms maintain circadian oscillation.

Recently, Baggs et al. developed a novel strategy termed "Gene Dosage Network Analysis" (GDNA) to describe network features in the human circadian clock that contribute to an organism's robustness against genetic perturbations. In their study, the authors used small interfering RNA (siRNA) to induce dose-dependent changes in gene expression of clock components within immortalized human osteosarcoma U2OS cells in order to build gene association networks consistent with known biochemical constraints in the mammalian circadian clock. Employing multiple doses of siRNA powered their quantitative PCR to uncover several network features of the circadian clock, including proportional responses of gene expression, signal propagation through interacting modules, and compensation through gene expression changes.

Proportional responses in downstream gene expression following siRNA-induced perturbation revealed levels of expression that were actively altered with respect to the gene being knocked down. For example, when Bmal1 was knocked down in a dose-dependent manner, Rev-ErbA alpha and Rev-ErbA beta mRNA levels were shown to decrease in a linear, proportional manner. This supported previous findings that Bmal1 directly activates Rev-erb genes and further suggests Bmal1 as a strong contributor to Rev-erb expression.

In addition, the GDNA method provided a framework to study biological relay mechanisms in circadian networks through which modules communicate changes in gene expression. The authors observed signal propagation through interactions between activators and repressors, and uncovered unidirectional paralog compensation among several clock gene repressors—for example, when PER1 is depleted, there is an increase in Rev-erbs, which in turn propagates a signal to decrease expression in BMAL1, the target of the Rev-erb repressors.

By examining the knockdown of several transcriptional repressors, GDNA also revealed paralog compensation where gene paralogs were upregulated through an active mechanism by which gene function is replaced following knockdown in a non-redundant manner—that is, one component is sufficient to sustain function. These results further suggested that a clock network utilizes active compensatory mechanisms rather than simple redundancy to confer robustness and maintain function. In essence, the authors proposed that the observed network features act in concert as a genetic buffering system to maintain clock function in the face of genetic and environmental perturbation. Following this logic, we may use genomics to explore network features in the circadian oscillator.

Another study conducted by Zhang et al. also employed a genome-wide small interfering RNA screen in U2OS cell line to identify additional clock genes and modifiers using luciferase reporter gene expression. Knockdown of nearly 1000 genes reduced rhythm amplitude. The authors found and confirmed hundreds of potent effects on period length or increased amplitude in secondary screens. Characterization of a subset of these genes demonstrated a dosage-dependent effect on oscillator function. Protein interaction network analysis showed that dozens of gene products were directly or indirectly associate with known clock components. Pathway analysis revealed these genes are overrepresented for components of insulin and hedgehog signaling pathway, the cell cycle, and folate metabolism. Coupled with data demonstrating that many of these pathways are clock-regulated, Zhang et al. postulated that the clock is interconnected with many aspects of cellular function.

A systems biology approach may relate circadian rhythms to cellular phenomena that were not originally considered regulators of circadian oscillation. For example, a 2014 workshop at NHLBI assessed newer circadian genomic findings and discussed the interface between the body clock and many different cellular processes.

== Variation in circadian clocks ==
While a precise 24-hour circadian clock is found in many organisms, it is not universal. Organisms living in the high arctic or high antarctic do not experience solar time in all seasons, though most are believed to maintain a circadian rhythm close to 24 hours, such as bears during torpor. Much of the earth's biomass resides in the dark biosphere, and while these organisms may exhibit rhythmic physiology, for these organisms the dominant rhythm is unlikely to be circadian. For east-west migratory organisms—and especially those organisms that circumnavigate the globe—the absolute 24-hour phase might deviate over months, seasons, or years.

Some spiders exhibit unusually long or short circadian clocks. Some trashline orbweavers, for example, have 18.5-hour circadian clocks, but are still able to entrain to a 24-hour cycle. This adaptation may help the spiders avoid predators by allowing them to be most active before sunrise. Black widows' clocks are arrhythmic, perhaps due to their preference for dark environments.

== See also ==
- Chemical clock
- Chemical oscillator
