= Dmitri Nusinow =

Chronobiologist (b. 1976)

Dmitri Nusinow is an American chronobiologist who studies plant circadian rhythms. He was born on November 7, 1976, in Inglewood, California. He currently resides in St. Louis with his wife and two children, and his research focus includes a combination of molecular, biochemical, genetic, genomic, and proteomic tools to discover the molecular connections between signaling networks, circadian oscillators, and specific outputs. By combining these methods, he hopes to apply the knowledge elucidated from the Arabidopsis model to other plant species.

== Education and career ==
=== Early life ===
Dmitri (Meter) Nusinow grew up in Los Angeles, and as a high schooler, he was inspired by the potential that genetic engineering had to change lives through medicine and food security. Nusinow received his bachelor's degree in Microbiology and Molecular Genetics at University of California Los Angeles (UCLA) in 1998. After he graduated from UCLA, Nusinow worked in Dr. Jay Gralla's lab from 1998 to 1999 and studied in vitro analysis of RNA Pol II transcription in the fission yeast, S.pombe. He continued his education to earn his PhD in early mammalian development at the University of California, San Francisco (UCSF) from 1999 to 2006.

During his first four years of graduate school, Nusinow attempted to create a quadruple knock-in (KI) mouse that would purify the protein RNA complex of X-inactive specific transcript (Xist), which plays a key role in dosage compensation in female mammals. The method was unsuccessful, so Nusinow shifted his focus to the mammalian histone variant macroH2A for his graduate thesis statement. He discovered that the inhibition of PARP1 by macro-H2A1 contributed to X chromosome inactivation. While in graduate school, he attended a seminar by Dr. Roger Hangarter, who showed circadian-regulated movements in sunflowers. This seminar inspired Nusinow, and he became fascinated by the way plants could anticipate changes in their environment, such as moving their leaves to where the sun will rise the next day. Thereafter, Nusinow pivoted to studying circadian rhythms in plants.

=== Career ===
In 2007, Nusinow became a researcher at the Scripps Institute with Steve Kay, and continued working with the lab when it moved to University of California San Diego (UCSD) for five additional years. While in Kay's lab, he was influenced by fellow researcher Takato Imaizumi to study ELF3 in plants. In 2012, Nusinow became a principal investigator at the Donald Danforth Plant Science Center in St. Louis, MO and an adjunct professor of biology at Washington University in St. Louis. He also mentors high school students interested in biological research through the Students and Teachers as Research Scientists (STARS) program, a 6-week summer program through a variety of universities in Missouri. Timberland high school senior Ellen Gruebbeling worked with Dr. Dmitri Nusinow from the Donald Danforth Plant Science Center. Her research paper was titled "Testing conservation of circadian clock genes in Arabidopsis Thaliana and Setaria Viridis."

The Nusinow Lab is now working to understand how the circadian clock integrates with environmental signals to regulate plant growth, development, and physiology to improve plant productivity. They are interested in determining how plants are controlled by light and temperature to predict how they respond to a changing environment with climate change. They are also currently investigating how seasonal variation in temperature and day length affects the growth of plants and the function of key proteins in these processes. To further understand the molecular mechanisms involved, they use a wide range of tools and methods, including non-invasive imaging systems to monitor plant movement, bioluminescence, and fluorescence during long-term time-lapse experiments. The lab is also developing tools for rapid purification of protein complexes and maintaining epitope-tagged proteins at endogenous levels and in their native context. Additionally, they utilize techniques such as affinity purification, mass spectrometry, and genetics to identify, dissect, and define the protein complexes involved in the plant circadian clock. Nusinow's research has the potential to improve food security and expand agricultural production to previously inhospitable land.

=== Grants and awards ===
Dmitri Nusinow's research has been supported by several grant funding and collaborative initiatives. From 2008 to 2011, Nusinow received an NIH grant for the dissection of ELF3 functions in the Arabidopsis thaliana circadian clock. In 2021, Nusinow and fellow researcher Xuemin (Sam) Wang were awarded a $1.2 million grant from the National Institute of General Medical Sciences for their project, titled “Unraveling the molecular connections that link circadian rhythms and lipid metabolism.” This project aimed to explore the interplays between the circadian clock and lipid metabolism using Arabidopsis thaliana as a model organism, with the goal of understanding how these regulatory mechanisms have far-reaching implications for human health.

Nusinow has also been recognized for mentoring emerging scientists. Under his guidance, Sarah Pardi, a PhD student in his lab, was named the 2024 William H. Danforth Plant Science Fellow, an award recognizing graduate students who demonstrate exceptional potential to advance the field of plant science. Pardi's selection highlights the mentorship and training provided in Nusinow's laboratory.

== Scientific contributions ==
=== RNA Pol II Transcription ===
As a research associate in the Gralla lab at UCLA, Nusinow co-authored a study published in the Journal of Molecular Biology investigating the role of general transcription factors in RNA polymerase II transcription initiation. The work focused on Schizosaccharomyces pombe, demonstrating that transcription initiates within a narrow 25–40 base pair window downstream of the TATA box, guided by a scanning mechanism that favors purines. The team developed a functional in vitro transcription system and showed that activation depends on upstream elements and can be driven by the Gal4-VP16 activator. Cross-species experiments revealed that S. pombe factors could reprogram Saccharomyces cerevisiae transcription to mimic mammalian-like initiation, and that human TFIIB, but not its S. cerevisiae counterpart, could integrate into S. pombe complexes to alter start-site selection. This work positioned S. pombe as a valuable model for dissecting eukaryotic transcription initiation mechanisms.

=== Xist RNA and X Chromosome Inactivation ===
As a graduate student in Dr. Barbara Panning's lab in 2002, Nusinow and his team published a review in the Annual Review of Genetics outlining the role of Xist RNA in X chromosome inactivation. They explained that Xist RNA is necessary and sufficient for initiating and spreading silencing to inactivate one X chromosome (Xi) in females for dosage compensation. Xist RNA is encoded in the X-inactivation center (Xic), and cis-regulatory elements (CREs) on the Xistgene regulate its expression and activity while the X chromosome to be inactivated is selected. Xist RNA also coordinates chromatin modifications that maintain the inactive state of the Xi.

=== Histone Variant macroH2A1.2 and Gene Silencing ===
For his graduate thesis at the University of California, San Francisco, Nusinow characterized the histone variant macroH2A1.2, identified through novel post-translational modifications. He demonstrated that the histone domain of macroH2A1 contains multiple discrete regions sufficient for its enrichment in heterochromatic regions and on the inactive X chromosome (Xi), where it helps maintain gene silencing. He used tandem mass spectrometry to study covalent modifications on macroH2A1.2, confirming the presence of several modifications on endogenous macroH2a1.2. Such modifications may be highly relevant for regulating chromatin binding and structure.

Nusinow also established a functional link between macroH2A and Poly (ADP-ribose) polymerase 1 (PARP-1). PARP-1 is an enzyme involved in modulating chromatin structure, regulating gene expression, and repairing DNA. MacroH2A1.2 interacts with PARP-1 via its non-histone domain (NHD), which inhibits PARP-1 enzymatic activity in vitro. He demonstrated that macroH2A's inhibition of PARP-1 is crucial for maintaining chromatin silencing, especially at the inactive X chromosome. These findings suggest that macroH2A contributes to heterochromatin formation and transcriptional repression through recruitment and inhibition of PARP-1.

=== Circadian rhythms in Arabidopsis ===
Nusinow and his collaborators made significant contributions to understanding how Arabidopsis thaliana regulate their internal clocks in response to environmental cues. One of their key discoveries involved the Evening Complex (EC), a protein complex comprising ELF3, ELF4, and LUX. This complex plays a vital role in maintaining the plant's circadian rhythms by coordinating gene expression patterns that peak at dusk. Nusinow and his team demonstrated that the EC functions as a transcriptional repressor, controlling the expression of target genes that regulate growth and flowering in response to day length and temperature changes.

The research also revealed that mutations in any of the EC components lead to disrupted circadian rhythms, resulting in arrhythmic phenotypes and irregular growth patterns in Arabidopsis. They showed that the EC represses genes such as PRR7 and PRR9 during the evening to synchronize growth signals with environmental conditions. Nusinow's work helped clarify how Arabidopsis integrates light and temperature cues to maintain a stable circadian rhythm, ultimately influencing flowering time and seasonal adaptation.

==== Photosensitivity of FKF1/GI complex ====
In 2007, researchers Sawa, Nusinow, Kay, and Imaizumi studied how two proteins in Arabidopsis, called FKF1 (Flavin-binding, Kelch repeat, F-box 1) and GI (Gigantea), help the plant control when it flowers depending on day length (called the photoperiod).

They became interested in FKF1 and GI because both proteins showed peak levels of activity at the same time during long daylight periods. To understand how these proteins might work together, the researchers first isolated them in a test tube. They found that blue light caused FKF1 and GI to form a complex (or bind together). This happened because FKF1 has a special region called the LOV domain that can absorb blue light, and GI has a part at its beginning (the N terminus) that can attach to FKF1.

To see if this interaction also happened inside real plants (not just in a test tube), they used genetically modified Arabidopsis plants. They tagged FKF1 with a molecule called HA and GI with a TAP tag, which allowed them to detect when the two proteins formed a complex in living plants. Using a technique called two-hybrid screening, they confirmed that FKF1 and GI do bind to each other in vivo.

Finally, they discovered that this FKF1-GI complex helps turn on a gene called CONSTANS (CO) during the day. The CO gene is important because it promotes flowering. Their findings led to a model showing how the FKF1-GI complex helps Arabidopsis flower at the right time, depending on how long the days are.

==== Hypocotyl growth linked to ELF4-ELF4-LUX complex ====
Nusinow continued his research on Arabidopsis thaliana, and in 2011, he and his team published a paper in Nature where he identified a protein complex (called the evening complex (EC), because it peaks at dusk) made up of proteins encoded by Early Flowering 4 (ELF4), Early Flowering 3 (ELF3), and the gene lux arrhythmo (LUX), that regulates plant growth. The multiprotein complex is responsible for linking the circadian clock to the diurnal (daily) regulation of hypocotylgrowth, part of the stem in a germinating plant seedling. Through a series of transgenic experiments, he showed that ELF4, ELF3, and LUX were required for proper expression of Phytochrome Interacting Factor 4 (PIF4) and Phytochrome Interacting Factor 5 (PIF5), two transcription factors critical for regulating hypocotyl growth in Arabidopsis seedlings. The ELF4-ELF3-LUX complex repressed PIF4 and PIF5 expression in the early evening and the turnover of PIF4 and PIF5 at dawn enhanced hypocotyl growth. Nusinow also determined that ELF3 is necessary and sufficient to help ELF4 and LUX join to form a complex.

==== Discovery of PCH1 ====
In Arabidopsis, phytochrome B (phyB) perceives light and temperature signals to regulate fundamental morphogenic processes by interconverting between its active far-red light-absorbing Pfr state and its inactive red-light-absorbing Pr state. Upon photoconversion from Pr to Pfr, phyB forms subnuclear foci called photobodies (PBs), but the composition and molecular functions of these PBs remain unclear.

In 2015–2016, Nusinow and colleagues identified a protein called PCH1 (Photoperiodic Control of Hypocotyl) that was repeatedly associated with the evening complex in AP-MS analysis of the plant circadian clock. They found that PCH1 is an essential structural component of phyB photobodies and that it stabilizes the active Pfr form of phyB by preventing its thermal reversion back to the inactive Pr state. This process allows phyB signaling to persist under changing light and temperature conditions.

The discovery of PCH1 is important because it demonstrates that, while phyB is typically active during the day, PCH1 helps to extend the activity of phyB into the night, enabling plant cells to "remember" past illumination and adjust their growth accordingly. Loss of PCH1 disrupts the formation of photobodies, which compromises a range of downstream events, including photomorphogenesis, thermomorphogenesis, and input to the circadian clock.

When PCH1 is overexpressed, the formation of photobodies is enhanced, which increases the levels of phyB signaling. This suggests that manipulating the dynamics of photobody assembly could be used to modulate plant responses to light and temperature, potentially improving plant growth in changing environments.

=== CID Modules with reprogrammable ligand-binding specificity ===
In 2023, Nusinow and his lab team published an article in Nature Chemical Biology in which they engineer orthogonal modules that allow for reprogramming of ligand-binding specificity. They focus on abscisic acid (ABA), a stress hormone sensed by chemical-induced dimerization (CID) modules made up of the PYR1 receptor and the phosphatase HAB1. They introduced mutations to engineer two new orthogonal CID modules, PYR1*^{MANDI}/HAB1* and PYR1*^{AZIN}/HAB1*, and a clear method for further module development. The new modules could be reprogrammed to be sensitive for varying ligands. Nusinow and his colleagues demonstrated in both Arabidopsis and Saccharomyces that the new modules could detect banned pesticides such as azinphos and create genetic circuits, an exciting discovery for plant synthetic biology.

== Selected publications ==
- In Vitro Transcription and Start Site Selection in Schizosaccharomyces pombe (2002)
- Xist RNA and the Mechanism of X Chromosome Inactivation (2002)
- Investigation into the modification, localization and function of the mammalian histone macroH2A (2006)
- FKF1 and GIGANTEA Complex Formation is Required for Day-Length Measurement in Arabidopsis (2007)
- ELF4-ELF3-LUX Complex Links the Circadian Clock to Diurnal Control of Hypocotyl Growth (2011)
- PCH1 Integrates Circadian and Light-Signaling Pathways to Control Photoperiod-Responsive Growth in Arabidopsis (2016)
- An orthogonalized PYR1-based CID module with reprogrammable ligand-binding specificity (2023)
- Manipulation of photosensory and circadian signaling restricts phenotypic plasticity in response to changing environmental conditions in Arabidopsis (2024)
- Identification of phospholipase Ds and phospholipid species involved in circadian clock alterations using CRISPR/Cas9-based multiplex editing of Arabidopsis (2024)

== See also ==
- Circadian rhythm
- Plant biology
- Pseudo-response regulator (PRR)
- TOC1 (gene)
- Xist
- ELF3
- ELF4
- LUX
