= Stacey Harmer =

American chronobiologist

- Education: University of California, Berkeley (BA); University of California, San Francisco (PhD)
- Occupation: Professor · Researcher
- Awards: Howard Hughes Medical Institute Predoctoral Fellowship; NIH National Research Service Award; American Society for Photobiology New Investigator Award; Fellow of American Society of Plant Biologists; UC Davis College of Biological Sciences Faculty Research Award; UC Davis Chancellor's Fellowship; Fellow of the American Association for the Advancement of Science
- Scientific career
- Fields: Botany, Chronobiology, Cell Biology, Developmental Biology, Molecular Biology, Biochemistry, Genomics
- Institutions: University of California, Davis; Scripps Research Institute; Howard Hughes Medical Institute iPlant Collaborative

Stacey Harmer is a chronobiologist whose work centers on the study of circadian rhythms in plants. Her research focuses on the molecular workings of the plant circadian clock and its influences on plant behaviors and physiology. She is a professor in the Department of Plant Biology at the University of California, Davis.

== Education ==
Harmer achieved her bachelor's degree in Biochemistry from the University of California, Berkeley in 1991, then earned a PhD at the University of California, San Francisco in 1998. At UC San Francisco, she was a Howard Hughes Predoctoral Fellow in Tony DeFranco's lab, while researching the systems involving signal transduction by the B-cell antigen receptor.

From 1998 to 2002, Harmer changed her post-doctoral studies from immunology to plant biology in order to research under Steve Kay at the Scripps Research Institute. Harmer received the NIH National Research Service Award and explored and analyzed the circadian rhythms in the lab with her in-depth knowledge in biochemistry and plant anatomy. When Harmer created her own lab, she started to investigate circadian rhythms in plants and the plant clock's function in plant physiology, which continues to be her primary scientific interest.

== Harmer Lab ==
The Harmer Lab is a research group dedicated to studying the plant circadian clock, in particular the molecular processes and physiology underlying plant development and responses to environmental stimuli. The Harmer Lab was established when Harmer was recruited to the Department of Plant Biology at the University of California, Davis.

By using Arabidopsis thaliana and the sunflower as models, the Harmer lab focuses on understanding how molecular mechanisms in plant circadian systems control responses to a variety of environmental cues through signaling pathways and physiological timing. Some of the lab's current research projects include investigating processes by which plants respond to fluctuations in light and identifying genes and pathways involved in regulating the plant circadian clock.

Over time, the Harmer Lab has made several important contributions to the field of plant chronobiology:

- Identifying several crucial genes involved in plant circadian growth including LHY and CCA1.
- Exploring timekeeping genes and rhythmic feedback loops in the Arabidopsis thaliana.
- Mapping detailed chronobiological models and factors of circadian rhythms in plants.

The Harmer Lab also collaborates with a number of outside research groups including:

- The Blackman Lab at the University of California, Berkeley.
- The Jones Lab at the University of Glasgow.
- The Lagarias Lab at the University of California, Davis.
- The Maloof Lab at the University of California, Davis.
- The Montemurro Lab at the University of Bari Aldo Moro.
- The Yanovsky Lab at the Leloir Institute.

== Background of plant chronobiology ==
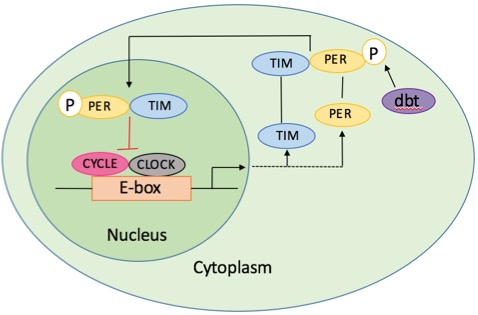
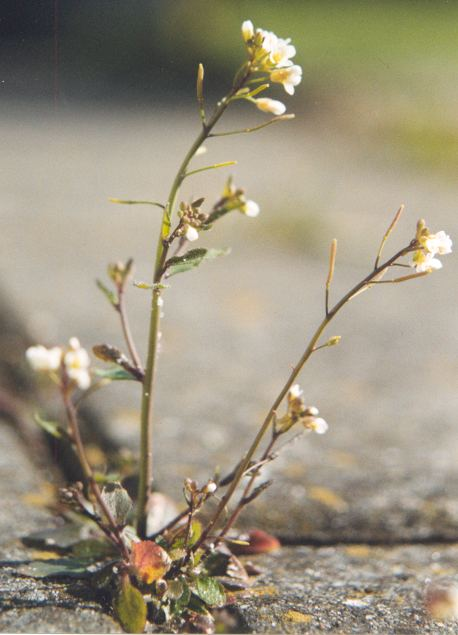
On the left, an example of endogenous workings for TTFL is shown through a Drosphila diagram. On the right, Arabidopsis thaliana is a model plant used to study the TTFL.

At the forefront of the field, plants were used as models to establish the presence of circadian rhythms in organisms. With their accurate, endogenous clock to synchronize their physiology with the cycle of day and night, plants became model organisms to study within the field. Circadian rhythms enable plants to anticipate seasonal changes and adjust accordingly in order to promote survival and overall fitness through the facilitation of leaf movement, growth, pollination, and more. A prime example of a model plant is Arabidopsis thaliana, also used by Harmer in many of her papers. Due to its relatively small and non-repetitive genome, Arabidopsis thaliana was also used to elucidate the existence of a TTFL (transcription-translation feedback loop) that facilitates the workings of an endogenous clock.

While research is still being conducted on the intricacies of the plant TFFL, many proteins and genes have been identified such as CCA1, TOC1, LHY. CCA1 and LHY are two, relatively well-researched transcription factors that work as repressors in the plant TFFL. These repressors target genes like ELF4, LUX, TOC1, GIGANTEA (GI), and more. The combination of activators and repressors and their oscillations within the plant circadian clock ultimately control phenotypic and physiological outputs. Such findings are foundational for Harmer's work on plant circadian rhythms and their subsequent effect on plant physiology. In many of her papers, Harmer utilizes implicated genes in the plant TFFL to conduct experiments.

== Scientific research ==
=== Clock regulation of physiology ===
Harmer found that circadian clock regulation within plants promoted physiological daily rhythms in root, leaf, and stem growth that were in direct response to a number of external cues including water availability, temperature, and light. Through various experiments and collaborations, Harmer discovered that this plant growth advantage revealed an underlying relationship with the genomic and metabolic makeup of the circadian clock—contributing to current models explaining plant optimization with the environment.

The circadian mechanism within these plants involves numerous transcription factors that contribute to multiple transcriptional feedback loops that form a highly detailed, modeled network revolving around morning and evening outputs. Harmer suggests a simpler model that incorporates morning genes including CCA1 and LHY, and afternoon genes like RVE 4,6,8 within a regulatory system to investigate the robustness of plant rhythms in the face of changing environmental conditions. This central transcriptional feedback serves as a core part of the plant circadian clock and provides clues as to how solar tracking, water efficiency, and daily growth operate in plant systems.

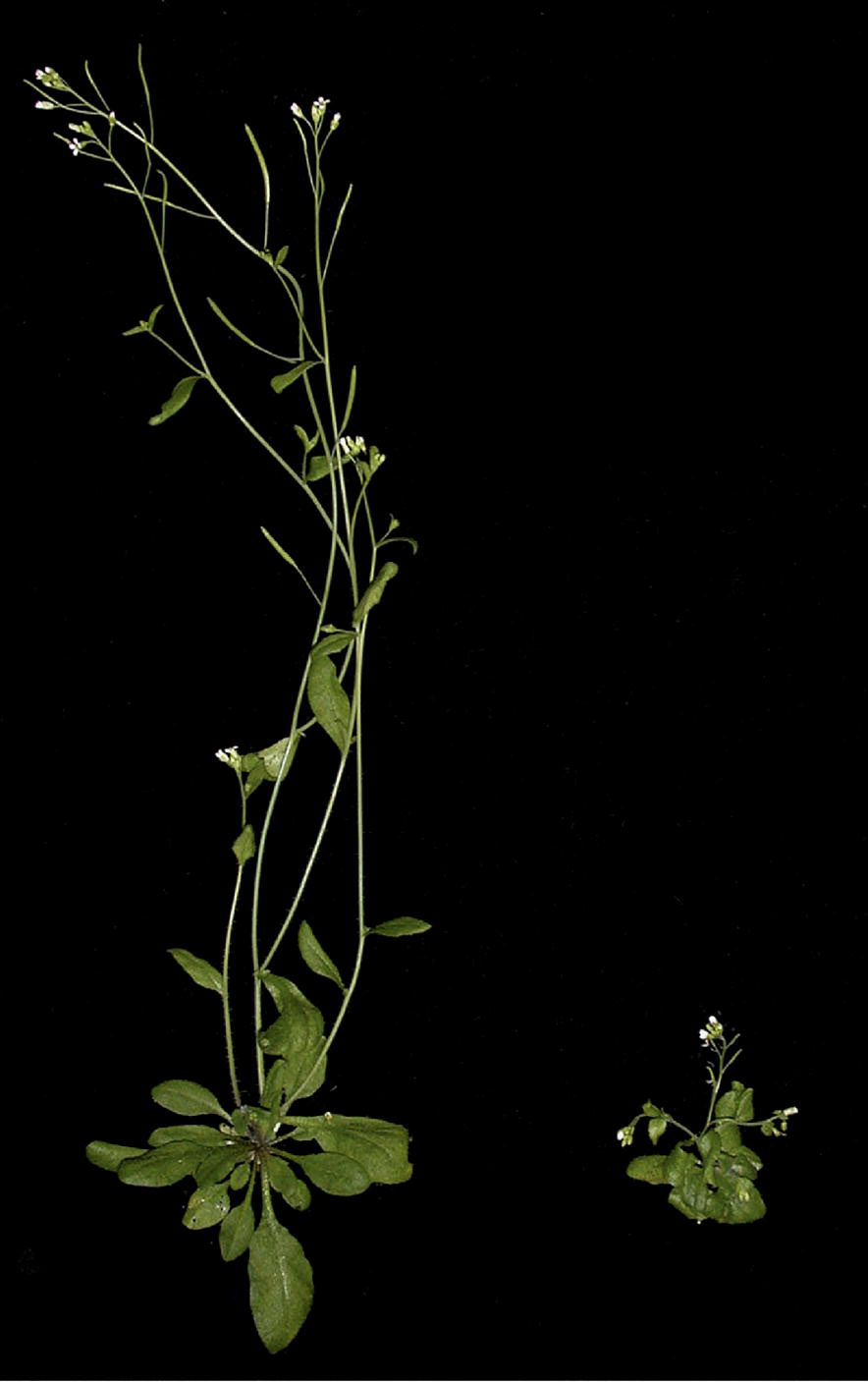
The Arabidopsis plant underwent auxin-induced growth (left). The rhythms in the elongated stem are controlled by the circadian clock.

The lab is currently exploring the role the eukaryote protein XCT to find out more about its role in stunting plant growth and regulating the circadian oscillator. With Harmer's work on the Arabidopsis thaliana, XCT has been found to rescue growth in yeast mutants.

=== Auxin signaling pathway ===
Auxin is a hormone essential to plant growth and development. Previous studies reported that the circadian clock coordinates plant growth to external environmental cues. Thus, the Harmer lab, in collaboration with another chronobiologist (Michael Covington), sought to investigate the clock regulation of auxin. In this investigation, Harmer and Covington conclude that auxin is clock-controlled in many aspects of its regulation (auxin production, auxin carriers, auxin sensors, etc.). Specifically, Harmer utilized Arabidopsis and its promoters of known clock-regulated genes in the plant TTFL (such as CCA1 and TOC1) to record expression of firefly reporter genes also known as a luciferase assay. This method allows researchers to directly record and monitor the rhythmicity of circadian genes in plants.

Harmer investigated the effects of auxin dosage on the rhythmic expression in Arabidopsis. She found that exogenous application of the auxin IAA to plants causes a lengthening of the plants' free-running period. This dosage was also consistent when the luciferase assay was applied to other clock-associated promoters such as Gigantea (GI), CAB2, CCR2, and ELF3. Harmer then investigated circadian control over auxin signaling and its outputs such as plant growth. Harmer focused on the auxin-induced growth of the plant stem, specifically the hypocotyl. Under controlled conditions, Harmer recorded the rhythmic elongation of the stems in control and IAA-treated plants. She concluded that plants treated with exogenous auxin IAA had enhanced growth. She further affirmed previous studies, stating that plant sensitivity to auxin varied with time of day, by displaying that the variable sensitivity is also a plant response regulated by circadian auxin transcriptional and growth responses. Thus, by using these techniques, Harmer and Covington were able to conclude that plant responses to both endogenous auxin and exogenous auxin are regulated and controlled by the plant circadian clock. Such a link between the circadian clock and auxin signaling had never been documented before and broadened the field by connecting these two important mechanisms.

=== Sunflower heliotropism ===
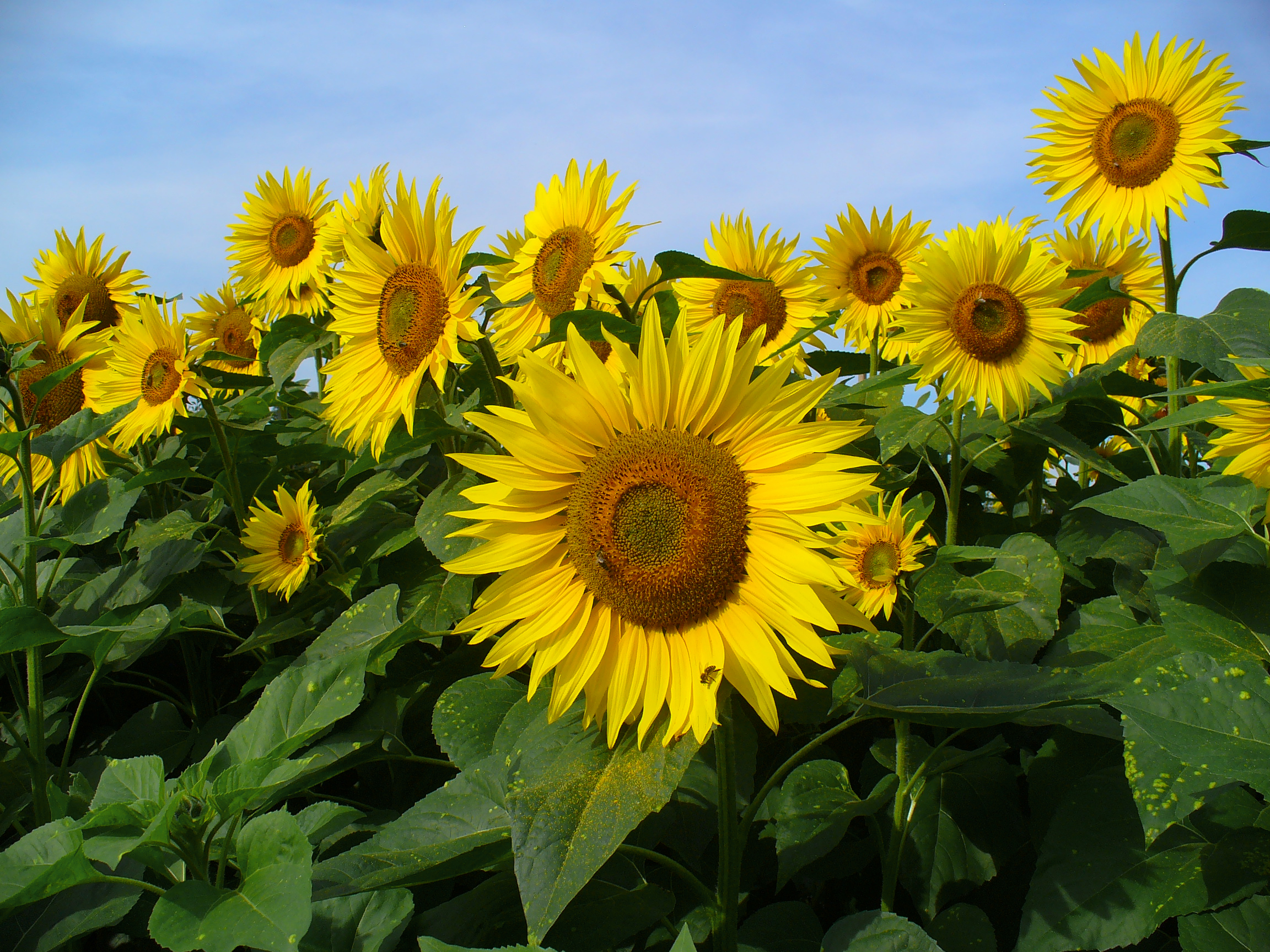
Circadian and light regulation of sunflower stem growth leads to a uniform eastward orientation of plants at the time of flowering.

Harmer discovered that the circadian clock controls Arabidopsis seedlings' sensitivity, which was influenced by auxin; sensitive reaction to auxin was different depending on the time of day. Building off this work, Harmer wondered about the significance of circadian clock and auxin signaling network on plant growth, so she studied circadian clock in sunflower heliotropism, or solar tracking. The sunflower's long stem made it easy to identify its heliotropism. Following the sun's location, the sunflower's leaves and stems moved from east to west during light. Anticipating sunrise, the flowers moved from west to east during dark; thus, the plant clock played a role in heliotropism.

Since the sunflowers did not have pulvini, organs that controlled solar tracking for other plants, Harmer hypothesized that stem growth may cause heliotropism. She monitored growth of stems and solar tracking in ''dwarf2'' (dw2) sunflowers, which lack gibberellin growth hormones. Due to this deficiency, dw2 sunflowers have short stems and no heliotropism. After treating these flowers with gibberellin hormones, heliotropism was restored. As a result, this day and night movement was caused by the stem's elongation.

Harmer further hypothesized that heliotropism occurs from the irregular growth rates on the opposite sides of the stem. On the east side, the stem had more growth during the day and less growth during the night, but on the west side, the stem experienced the opposite. This contrast indicated that the east side of the stem lengthened during day and the west side lengthened during night, which enabled it to move east to west during day and west to east at night. This uneven growth was controlled by genes influenced by light and circadian rhythm. Harmer's findings showed how circadian rhythms regulated the sunflowers movement during light and dark.

Currently, Harmer is interested in understanding the molecular mechanism behind the sunflower's growth rates. Current reports suggest that certain pathways control the stem's movements during day and night.

=== Circadian clock in flower development ===
Harmer expanded her findings to search for the circadian clock's role in flower development and pollination. Sunflower heads are made up of hundreds or thousands of florets, or small individual flowers that are clustered to form a flower structure, which is a capitulum. To allow outcrossing, the florets constantly change their sex. From the outside to inside of the head, the florets are the oldest to youngest in development. In the capitulum, three to four rings of florets grow at the same time and day.

Harmer hypothesized that the specific time of sunflower anthesis, the opening of the flower, could involve a circadian regulator. To test her theory, she monitored the sunflower capitula in constant darkness. The circadian rhythms of ovary and stamen continued to free run, while florets bloomed every 24 hours similar to their anthesis during light-dark cycles. The daily rhythms and floret growth without environmental distractions suggested the control from the circadian clock.

Circadian processes maintain temperature compensation. During constant darkness at 18 °C, 25 °C, and 30 °C, the ovary and stamen development maintained free-running rhythms. The general periods of these growths were similar across all temperatures. The internal, rhythmic activity that modulated floret's anthesis was temperature-compensated, further pushing the hypothesis on the plant clock. Based on her studies, Harmer concluded that the circadian clock, light, and temperature signals modulate the developmental timing of florets. Harmer continues to investigate the pathways that control when late-stage florets grow. Her findings opened up the possibility that the floret's anthesis may seduce pollinators, thus encouraging reproductive performance.

=== Relationship between internal and external cues ===
Harmer has also investigated the interplay of internal and external cues in Arabidopsis circadian rhythms. Specifically, Harmer discovered dual modes of regulation of the phytochrome-interacting proteins PIF4 and PIF5, which promote plant growth, by the internal circadian clock at the transcript level and external light at the protein level. Her findings provide a framework for explaining how internal and external cues regulate rhythmic phenotypes such as plant growth.

== Honors ==
Harmer is the recipient of several honors, both from professional societies and her institution:

- 2011 - University of California, Davis Chancellor's Fellow: awarded for expertise in her field
- 2020 - Fellow of the American Association for the Advancement of Science (AAAS): awarded for her scientific efforts in advancing the field of chronobiology
- 2021 - Fellow of American Society of Plant Biologists: awarded for sustained contributions to the field of plant biology
- NIH National Research Service Award: awarded to scientists-in-training to gain research opportunities
- American Society of Photobiology's New Investigator Award: awarded for impactful research at the beginning of an investigator's career

== Publications ==
- Atamian, Hagop S.; Creux, Nicky M.; Brown, Robin Isadora; Garner, Austin G.; Blackman, Benjamin K.; Harmer, Stacey L. (2016). "Circadian regulation of sunflower heliotropism, floral orientation, and pollinator visits". Science. 353 (6299): 587–590. Bibcode:2016Sci...353..587A. doi:10.1126/science.aaf9793. PMID 27493185.
- Creux, Nicky; Harmer, Stacey (2019). "Circadian Rhythms in Plants". Cold Spring Harbor Perspectives in Biology. 11 (9) a034611. doi:10.1101/cshperspect.a034611. PMC 6719598. PMID 31138544.
- Harmer, Stacey L.; Brooks, Christopher J. (2018). "Growth-mediated plant movements: Hidden in plain sight". Current Opinion in Plant Biology. 41: 89–94. Bibcode:2018COPB...41...89H. doi:10.1016/j.pbi.2017.10.003. PMC 5826749. PMID 29107827.
- Hsu, Polly Yingshan; Devisetty, Upendra K.; Harmer, Stacey L. (2013). "Accurate timekeeping is controlled by a cycling activator in Arabidopsis". eLife. 2 e00473. doi:10.7554/eLife.00473. PMC 3639509. PMID 23638299.
- Hu, Wei; Franklin, Keara A.; Sharrock, Robert A.; Jones, Matthew A.; Harmer, Stacey L.; Lagarias, J. Clark (2013). "Unanticipated regulatory roles for Arabidopsis phytochromes revealed by null mutant analysis". Proceedings of the National Academy of Sciences. 110 (4): 1542–1547. Bibcode:2013PNAS..110.1542H. doi:10.1073/pnas.1221738110. PMC 3557068. PMID 23302690.
- Jones, Matthew A.; Morohashi, Kengo; Grotewold, Erich; Harmer, Stacey L. (2019). "Arabidopsis JMJD5/JMJ30 Acts Independently of LUX ARRHYTHMO within the Plant Circadian Clock to Enable Temperature Compensation". Frontiers in Plant Science. 10 57. Bibcode:2019FrPS...10...57J. doi:10.3389/fpls.2019.00057. PMC 6367231. PMID 30774641.
- Marshall, Carine M.; Thompson, Veronica L.; Creux, Nicky M.; Harmer, Stacey L. (2023). "The circadian clock controls temporal and spatial patterns of floral development in sunflower". eLife. 12 e80984. doi:10.7554/eLife.80984. PMC 9977281. PMID 36637156.
- Shalit-Kaneh, Akiva; Kumimoto, Roderick W.; Filkov, Vladimir; Harmer, Stacey L. (2018). "Multiple feedback loops of the Arabidopsis circadian clock provide rhythmic robustness across environmental conditions". Proceedings of the National Academy of Sciences. 115 (27): 7147–7152. Bibcode:2018PNAS..115.7147S. doi:10.1073/pnas.1805524115. PMC 6142266. PMID 29915068.
- Vandenbrink, Joshua P.; Brown, Robin Isadora; Harmer, Stacey L.; Blackman, Benjamin K. (2014). "Turning heads: The biology of solar tracking in sunflower". Plant Science. 224: 20–26. Bibcode:2014PlnSc.224...20V. doi:10.1016/j.plantsci.2014.04.006. PMID 24908502.
