= Bisathi Bharath =

Indian social worker and activist

- Born: Anantapur, India
- Education: Master of Arts in Political Science from Sri Krishnadevaraya University, Bachelor of Arts from Government College Ananthapur, Andhra Pradesh, Master of Arts in Sociology from IGNOU New Delhi
- Occupations: Social worker, activist
- Organization(s): Ministry of Youth Affairs & Sports, Government of India
- Known for: Awarded by President of India
- Awards: National Youth Awardee from Govt of India, NSS President of India Awardee from Govt of India, ToT Trainer at NYKS, MoYAS, Govt of India & Princess Diana Awardee 2021

Bisathi Bharath is an Indian social worker, activist, and volunteer. He received National Service Scheme Award by President of India, Shri Ram Nath Kovind in 2017, presented by Ministry of Youth Affairs and Sports, Government of India for his work. In 2021 he received the Diana Award which was chosen by a panel of former prime ministers of the United Kingdom. He also received honorable United Nations Volunteers Award in 2022. He received various other awards for his youth development work.

== Recognition ==
During the 27th National Youth Festival 2024, Bharath has been honoured with the National Youth Award by Union Ministry of Youth Affairs and Sports, Government of India, for his voluntary contributions in youth development such as organising activities during Azadi ka Amrit Mahotsav, held blood donation camps and collected 1,250 units of blood. He also provided career guidance to 2800 youth in rural areas.

== See also ==
- Vidhi Palsapure
- Ritika Verma
