= Kewal Krishan (forensic anthropologist) =

Indian forensic anthropologist (born 1973)

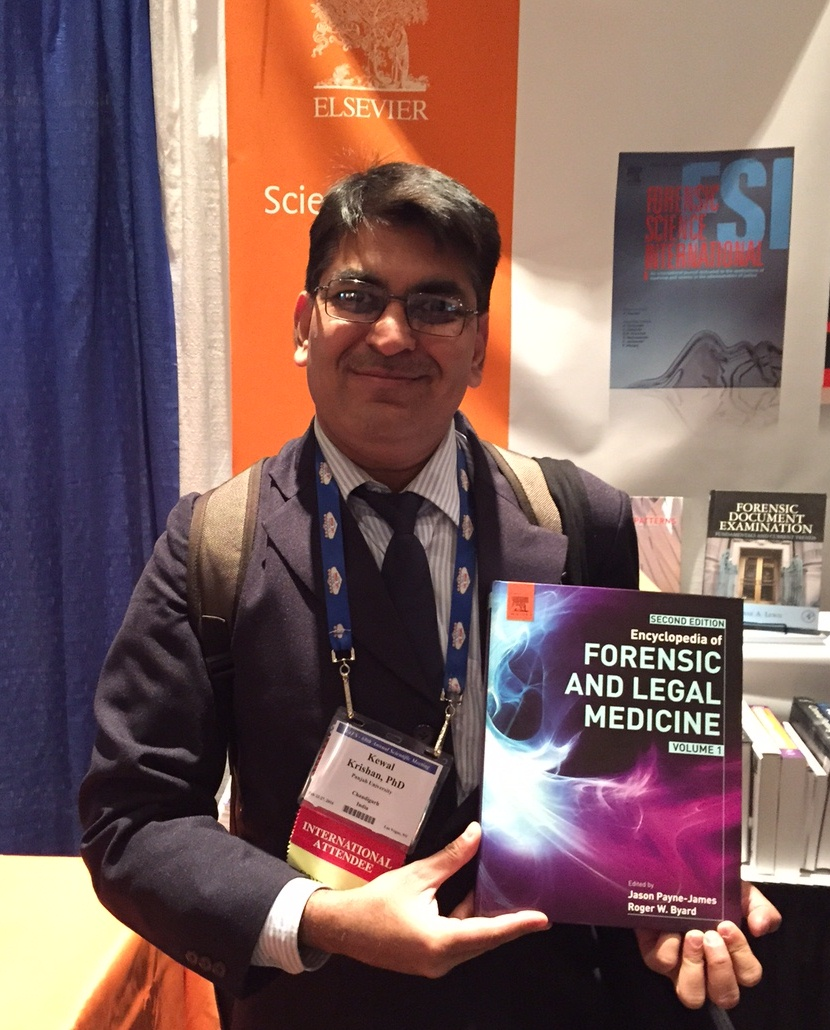
- Born: 24 November 1973 (age 52); Chandigarh, India
- Known for: Contributions to Forensic anthropology in India, Heel-Ball Index
- Awards: Faculty Research Award
- Scientific career
- Fields: Forensic anthropologist Biological anthropologist Forensic scientist
- Workplaces: Panjab University
- Website: anthropology.puchd.ac.in

Kewal Krishan, an Indian forensic anthropologist, is a professor of physical anthropology and former Chair of Department of Anthropology and Dean, International Students at Panjab University, Chandigarh, India. He has contributed to the development of forensic anthropology in India.

== Early life and education ==
Krishan was born in 1973 in a small village Mullanpur Garibdass of District Mohali in Punjab state of north India where he studied at Government High School. He completed his bachelor's degree, master's degree in Anthropology and earned Ph.D. in Forensic Anthropology in 2003 from Panjab University, Chandigarh, India. Krishan is an elected fellow of the Royal Anthropological Institute of Great Britain and Ireland (FRAI).

== Career ==
In the subfield of "Legal & Forensic Medicine", Krishan has been included in the top 2% of scientists on the science-wide author databases of standardized citation indicators list. Krishan is the only anthropologist from India in this subfield. He was ranked 16th in Legal & Forensic Medicine category in 2023. In 2024, he was ranked at 13th position among 14,394 forensic scientists. He is one of the most cited forensic scientists with over 415 publications and more than 150,000 citations. In 2022, Krishan ranked 3rd in forensic anthropology research according to a bibliometrics study published by Journal of Forensic and Legal Medicine.

== Research ==
Krishan's research focuses on human morphology and its forensic applications within Indian populations. He has authored contributions for Encyclopedia of Forensic Sciences 2nd Edition and Encyclopedia of Forensic and Legal Medicine 2nd Edition published by Elsevier in 2013 and 2016 respectively. A primary focus of his work is forensic podiatry of the north Indian population. His studies have examined the correlation between body weight and footprints and its interpretation in crime scene investigation. He also established some of the unique and individualistic characteristics of the footprints that are helpful in the identification of criminals. He devised and calculated the effect of limb asymmetry on estimation of stature in forensic examinations. Krishan developed a novel index called Heel-Ball Index in the forensic literature emphasizing its relevance in sex determination. He has published unique work on the footprint ridge density of Indian population and its significance in forensic identification.
