= Technothlon =

School championship in India

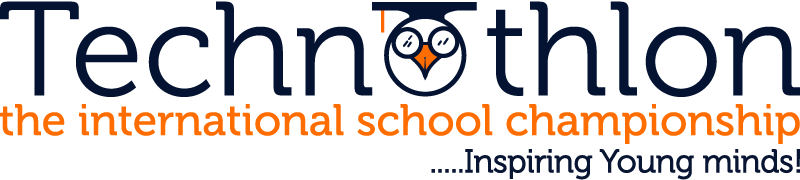
- Motto: Inspiring Young Minds
- Institution: Indian Institute of Technology Guwahati
- Location: Guwahati
- Established: 2004
- Affiliations: Techniche
- Website: technothlon.techniche.org.in

Technothlon is an International School Championship organized by the IIT Guwahati. Technothlon began in 2004 with an aim to ‘Inspire Young Minds’. Starting on its journey with a participation of 200 students confined to the city of Guwahati, over the next 17 years Technothlon has expanded its reach to over 450+ cities all over India and various centers abroad.

The contest is organized over 2 rounds: a written preliminary examination, Prelims, which takes place in numerous schools all over India in July (Online this year due to Pandemic) and Mains - which is conducted at IIT Guwahati, among the top 50 teams/students from each IX-X(Junior Squad) and XI-XII (Hauts Squad) class students. It is a team-based event — two students participate as a team (individual from 2020 to 2023 due to the COVID pandemic), attempting the paper together and also participate in the Mains event as a team (individual this year due to pandemic).

== Aim ==
Through a series of events involving mental aptitude, logic, and dexterity, Technothlon seeks to provide school students a platform to build fundamental experience and knowledge, to exercise co-ordination skills, and to think out of the box. As its preliminary round is conducted through several centers in India, it is a competitive test of critical thinking. Its final round is conducted in IIT-Guwahati during Techniche, the annual Techno-Management festival of IIT Guwahati.

== History ==
Technothlon 2004 - started from a small room in the campus of IIT Guwahati with a participation of 200.

Technothlon 2005 - took its first step forward; Science Exhibitions are conducted in Local Schools of Guwahati. Participation increased to 350.

Technothlon 2006 covers the seven sisters. Participation went over 700.

Technothlon 2007 reached Hyderabad. Participation reached the three figures.

Technothlon 2008 became National. Participation reached four figures.

Technothlon 2009 witnessed a manifold increase in the reach with tie-up with nearly 1000 Kendriya Vidyalaya schools. Over 60 nationwide media articles were published and it was conducted in 50+ centers all over India.

Technothlon 2010 went International. For the first time Technothlon was conducted abroad in the cities of Singapore and Dubai. Moreover, Technothlon also reached another milestone at the National level with the tie up with nearly 600 Jawahar Navodaya Vidyalayas. This time the exam was held in 75+ cities across the country.

In 2011, the participation increased to around 120 cities and was held in about 150 centers. Rajendra K. Pachauri – Nobel Laureate, Nobel Peace Prize 2007 & Chairman of Intergovernmental Panel on Climate Change impressed the participants of the Mains round with his lectures in Technothlon 2011.

It was witnessed by nearly 150 cities and around 200 centers, which included almost all the big states of India. Dr. Udaya Kumar, the maker of the Rupee symbol graced the event as the chief guest and also as a judge for "Final Showdown", Hauts during Techniche. Technothlon 2012 also witnessed an amazing lecture especially for Technothlon students by George Kourounis, Storm Chaser and host of television series Angry Planet. International students from Moscow and Kathmandu also participated in 2012.

Technothlon 2013 amplified its reach manifold by collaborating with nearly 100 private schools for the first time in its history. Being conducted in nearly 200 centers, Technothlon expanded its reach to around 20 states at the national level along with being conducted successfully at the international level as well in Kathmandu. During Mains, the participants were introduced to the very new world of Astronomy by the Kepler Mission Manager at NASA Ames Research Center, Roger Hunter. Not only this, but the students also got a chance to attend a workshop on Humanoids by A-Set. Dr. Gautam Barua, Former Director (2003–2013), IIT Guwahati motivated the participants during the crucial nerve-racking hours of Final Showdown, Hauts.

Technothlon 2014 expanded its reach to 200 cities, with almost 300 centres across India, making it the largest Technothlon then. And also, for the first time, the examination was also conducted with the question paper printed in Hindi. Technothlon also launched its own initiative - LED (Learn Experience Discover) - which involved the Technothlon organizers reaching out to the under-privileged students and demonstrating small science experiments, thus taking a step in introducing scientific temperament in the children. The top 50 teams, who made it to IIT Guwahati for the Mains got an opportunity to interact with Christer Fuglesang, Swedish physicist and ESA Astronaut, during which he shared with the participants the experiences of space.

Technothlon 2015 thanks to tie up with Kendriya Vidyalayas & Jawahar Navodaya Vidyalayas, brought in huge participation, and which helped widening the reach quite remote places of the country (E.g. Naxalite affected Dantewada, Chhattisgarh) bringing in participation of 12,000 students from these KVs and JNVs. The reach expanded to 350 examination centers across 250 cities in the country. Technothlon also launched its own blog, on which it followed some of the behind-the-scenes activity of the Technothlon team as well as an informative blog. And the highlight was a tie-up with UNICEF in inspiring young minds. During the Mains, the participants interacted with Claude Nicollier, Swiss ESA and Professor at EPFL.

Due to the ongoing COVID-19 pandemic, Team Technothlon decided in the first week of May 2020 to conduct Technothlon 2020 entirely online. To adapt to this format, the organization launched the "Logic Week" series in May 2020, featuring weekly events focused on specific themes: Combinatorics, Chess, Cryptography, and General Puzzles.

Technothlon 2020 had some big changes, the biggest of all being that Prelims and Mains would be held online and that students will participate individually, as opposed to our previous structure of participants attempting the paper and other events in pairs. Through the months of June and July, we finalized the Prelims papers for both the squads.

Technothlon endeavors to give its participants a unique experience. Finalists (the top 50 of both the squads) could visit the IITG campus to experience Technothlon. With Mains being held online, the Technothlon team came up with the event of ‘Campus La Vie’ so that the finalists can experience life at IIT Guwahati, albeit virtually. Continuing in the spirit of competition, two multiplayer events- Marauders Chess and Stratego were created, with complex rules aiming to bring out the ‘Mastermind’ in students.

Finally, Technothlon 2020 closing ceremony took place on October 30. The winners received a cash prize of 40k, the first runner ups got a cash prize of 25k and the second runner ups got a cash prize of 15k.

Technothlon 2024 - Back Offline: After 4 years of online Prelims, Technothlon 2024 returned to the offline mode with the Prelims conducted in over 120 cities and 140+ centres on 14 July 2024. It was also brought back to the team format, with students participating in teams of two in both the Prelims and Mains. The Mains were held from 30 August to 1 September, at IIT Guwahati - with the top 25 teams from each squad competing in exciting events related to maths, logic, auctions, circuitry, mechanics and online events.

== Eligibility and participant selection process ==
Technothlon is conducted for students of class IX to XII. There are two squads for which the examination is held. The first is the Junior squad and the second is the Hauts squad. For a student to appear in the Junior squad examination, he/she must be VIII class passed and must not have appeared for the X boards i.e. The students should be studying in IX or X STD. For a student to be appearing for the Hauts squad examination, he/she must have passed the X board examination and not appeared for the XII board examination.

The members can belong to the same class or as well as different class. For example: a team consisting of one member from class IX and one of class X is perfectly acceptable. The basic requirements for team formation is that they should consist of exactly two members from the same squad and the same city.

=== Modes of registration ===
The interested students can register themselves for the examination online or offline. Technothlon is conducted over various cities and centers with the help of city representatives. The city representatives are responsible for collecting the registrations offline. Participating schools can collect the registration fees themselves and then prepare a demand draft to be handed over to the city representatives.

== Structure ==
=== Examination ===
Students participate in teams of two. There are two duos:

1. Junior Duo – Students of classes 9th and 10th
2. Hauts Duo – Students of classes 11th and 12th

Technothlon is held in two stages:

1. Prelims: Generally held on 2nd or 3rd Sundays of July every Year.
2. Mains: To be held at IIT Guwahati during Techniche — Held in 1st week of Sept every year

Prelims is in general an objective written exam. It involves no syllabus or general knowledge requirement and relies solely on the student's logical and analytic thinking abilities. The exam is generally of 2 and ½ hour length. The question paper will have various sections like maths, puzzles, code crunchers etc. Each section has its own unique marking scheme. It is held nationwide, at selected cities on the 2nd Sunday of the month of July.

Mains is an event based competition. The selected teams compete against each other of the same squad to complete the events. Each team will have to face 3 events from which the winners will be selected. The events, like Prelims, do not require any prerequisite knowledge and students will be taught any extra knowledge they require. The events will vary every year. In addition to these, students can attend the workshops and fun events to spend the night.

Mains is conducted during Techniche, the Techno-Management Festival of IIT Guwahati, held during the first week of September. Other than events, the students can witness the competitions of Techniche, attend the Lecture Series of famous personalities and watch laser shows and Nite performances.

=== Technopedia and Techno Coup D'œil ===
Technopedia is the online module of Technothlon providing the participants an exclusive experience before they give the preliminary exam, with monthly quizzes and the various articles which are added to the module regularly. It aims at increasing the thinking capabilities and analytical reasoning and also helping them prepare for Prelims. Technopedia generally consists of 10 questions divided into 10 levels. A higher level gets unlocked only after answering the questions in the preceding level correctly. It is updated on a monthly basis for about 6 months before the preliminary examination of Technothlon. Only the students who have registered for prelims may log onto Technopedia using the provided ID and password. Participants who are consistent in clearing Technopedia monthly may expect a SURPRISE gift during Techniche.

Techno Coup D'œil is a series of questions published on the official Facebook page of Technothlon, giving the followers of the page a feel of what the actual paper might be like.

=== Selection process ===
1. Top 25 teams of each squad are selected on basis of their score in the Prelims examination.
2. Top teams, which perform excellently from each of these squads participate in events in Mains, from whom the Grand Champion of Technothlon is selected.

=== Rewards ===
Other than the top 25 teams which are selected for mains in each squad; the next 200 teams in both the squads are awarded Silver certificates from Techniche, IIT Guwahati. All the participants of the Mains will be served with accommodation for the four days during their stay at IIT Guwahati. All the teams attending the Mains events at IITG will also be given Gold certificates from Techniche, IITG.

=== Fees ===
Technothlon and Techniche, being non-profit organizations charge only an amount of Rs. 200 per team (of two students) as registration fees for the Prelims Examination conducted all over India which covers the examination conduction expenses.

== Heads ==
Zone	Team 2027	Team 2026	Team 2025	Team 2024	Team 2023	Team 2022	Team 2021	Team 2020	Team 2019	Team 2018	Team 2017
South Zone	Dinesh Naga Ramana	Uday Kiran	Ekshith Sai Gunakar	Sandeep Charlie Tetakali	Kanike Uday	Kammari Pravith Chary	Sushanth Reddy Manda	Sai Chandan	Suhas Prabhandam	Kaila Harsha Vardhan Reddy	Vishak R.
South Zone	Mugdha Nandurkar	Shreshtha Rastogi	Poojitha Reddy	Sarvagna Grandhi	GNS Preetam	Sriya Poluri	Navya Sri Manchikatla	Sai Chandan	Karthik Ganne	Apurva N. Saraogi	Likhita Konjeti
Central Zone	---	---	----	Hrishikeshan N	Paramveer Prakash	Prabhav Maheshwari	Shrushti Jain	Pooja Bhagat	Sparsh Dutta	Abhay Kshatriya	Udayraj Deshmukh
West Zone	Raiyan Ali Saiyed	Deep Shah	Varshini Reddy Sathineni	Sarvesh Murkute	Siddhant Jethwani	Sathvik Kalikivaya	Yatharth Singh	Vedansh Nehra	Aniruddh Bakshi	Ishan Azad	Pratyay Nigam
West Zone	Manvendra Singh Charan	Md Mahroof	Jayant Kumar	Sarvesh Murkute	Siddhant Jethwani	Sathvik Kalikivaya	Yatharth Singh	Vedansh Nehra	Aniruddh Bakshi	Ishan Azad	Pratyay Nigam
East Zone	Rabichand Saharia	Poulomi Chakraborty	Shubham Kumar Soni	Rahul Kumar	Raunak Agarwal	Siddhartha Kumar Singh	Prathamesh Muley	Shridham Mahajan	Vaibhav Singh	Paranjay Bagga	Yash Gandhe
North Zone	Swaraj Pani	Ritik Raj	Lalithkumar B S	Siva Keerthan	Nidhi Singh	Gowri Shankar Penugonda	Bhushan Kad	Aman Bansal	Milan Rayat	Shambhavi Das	Jitika Rajpoot
North Zone	Akash Roy	Ritik Raj	Charvi Sri Koppisetti	Utkarsh Verma	Nidhi Singh	Gowri Shankar Penugonda	Bhushan Kad	Aman Bansal	Milan Rayat	Shambhavi Das	Jitika Rajpoot
International	Priyanshu Gupta	---	---	---	---	---	---	---	---	---	---
