= IIT Guwahati =

Public technical university in Guwahati, Assam, India

Indian Institute of Technology Guwahati
- Motto: Jnana hi shakti hai
- Motto in English: Knowledge Is Power
- Type: Public technical university
- Established: 1994; 32 years ago
- Budget: ₹442.38 crore (US$47 million) (FY2022-23 est.)
- Chairman: Rajiv I. Modi
- Director: Devendra Jalihal
- Academic staff: 539
- Students: 7,849
- Undergraduates: 3,777
- Postgraduates: 1,901
- Doctoral students: 2,171
- Location: Guwahati, Assam, India
- Campus: Urban, 703.95 acres (2.8488 km^{2})
- Acronym: IITG
- Website: www.iitg.ac.in

The Indian Institute of Technology Guwahati (IIT Guwahati or IITG) is a public technical university located in Amingaon, North Guwahati, in the state of Assam, India. Established in 1994 by an act of the Parliament of India, it is the sixth Indian Institute of Technology and is designated an Institute of National Importance under the Institutes of Technology Act, 1961.

The institute's creation arose from the 1985 Assam Accord, signed between the All Assam Students Union and the Government of India, which included a commitment to establish an IIT in the state as part of broader improvements to education infrastructure in the region. The campus occupies approximately 700 acres on the northern bank of the Brahmaputra River, about 20 kilometres from central Guwahati.

== History ==
=== Origins in the Assam Accord ===
The establishment of IIT Guwahati traces to the Assam Accord of 1985, which resolved the six-year Assam Movement and committed the central government to improving education facilities in the state, including the creation of an IIT. Following the Accord, Education Consultants India Limited was tasked with preparing a project report; the resulting report, completed in 1989, was overseen by Prof. C. R. Malhotra, a former director of IIT Kanpur.

A site was initially selected at Misa in Nagaon district, and a society named "IIT Nagaon, Assam Society" was formed under the existing legal provisions. However, difficulties at the Misa site led a subsequent committee to select the present location in North Guwahati, and a new body, the "IIT Guwahati Assam Society," was constituted. In 1992, then Prime Minister P. V. Narasimha Rao declared during a visit to Assam that classes should begin that year, though this timeline proved impracticable as the director selection process did not begin until 1993.

=== Establishment and early years ===
IIT Guwahati was formally established in 1994 through an amendment to the Institutes of Technology Act. Prof. Dhirendra Nath Buragohain, a faculty member in civil engineering at IIT Bombay who had obtained his B.Tech, M.Tech, and Ph.D. from IIT Bombay and conducted postdoctoral research at the University of Wales, Swansea, joined as project director in February 1994 and became the founding director in July 1994.

Academic programmes commenced in 1995 with the first batch of Bachelor of Technology students admitted through the Joint Entrance Examination. The first Master of Technology students were admitted in 1998 through the Graduate Aptitude Test in Engineering.

=== Subsequent development ===
After Buragohain's retirement in 2003, Prof. Gautam Barua, a computer scientist who had been with IIT Guwahati since 1995 and previously served at IIT Kanpur, became director and served two terms from 2003 to 2013. He was succeeded by Prof. Gautam Biswas, a mechanical engineer from IIT Kanpur who had previously directed the CSIR-Central Mechanical Engineering Research Institute at Durgapur, who served as director from September 2013 to June 2019.

Prof. T. G. Sitharam, a geotechnical engineer from the Indian Institute of Science, took charge as director in July 2019. During his tenure, five new academic schools and five multidisciplinary centres were established. In December 2022, Sitharam was appointed chairman of the All India Council for Technical Education (AICTE). Prof. Devendra Jalihal, previously of IIT Madras, assumed the directorship in May 2024.

Directors of IIT Guwahati
Name	Tenure	Source
Dhirendra Nath Buragohain	1994-2003	
Gautam Barua	2003-2013	
Gautam Biswas	2013-2019	
T. G. Sitharam	2019-2022	
Devendra Jalihal	2024-present	

== Campus ==
The campus is situated on approximately 700 acres (2.8 km^{2}) on the northern bank of the Brahmaputra River, abutting the town of Amingaon in North Guwahati. The campus has the Brahmaputra on one side and hills on the others.

IIT Guwahati is a fully residential campus. Hostels are named after rivers and tributaries of northeastern India, including Manas, Dihing, Kapili, Siang, Kameng, Barak, Subansiri, Umiam, Brahmaputra, Dhansiri, Lohit, Disang, and Gaurang.

== Organisation and administration ==
All IITs follow a common organisational structure with the President of India as visitor. Each IIT is governed by a board of governors, which appoints the director as the chief academic and executive officer. The current chairman of the board of governors is Rajiv I. Modi, chairman and managing director of Cadila Pharmaceuticals.

=== Departments ===
IIT Guwahati has 13 academic departments: Biosciences and Bioengineering; Chemical Engineering; Chemistry; Civil Engineering; Computer Science and Engineering; Data Science and Artificial Intelligence; Design; Electronics and Electrical Engineering; Humanities and Social Sciences; Mathematics; Mechanical Engineering; and Physics.

The departments offer programmes at the B.Tech., B.Des., B.Sc., M.Tech., M.Des., M.A., M.Sc., and Ph.D. levels.

=== Academic schools ===
Between 2020 and 2021, five academic schools were established under the directorship of T. G. Sitharam: the School of Agro and Rural Technology, the School of Business, the Mehta Family School of Data Science and Artificial Intelligence, the School of Energy Sciences and Engineering, and the School of Health Science and Technology.

== Academics ==
=== Admissions ===
Undergraduate engineering admissions are conducted through JEE Advanced. Admissions to the undergraduate design programme, which were previously conducted through JEE Advanced, have been conducted through UCEED since 2016. A special BS programme in Biomedical Science and Engineering was launched in 2025 which admitted students through IISER Aptitude Test. Postgraduate admissions are conducted through IIT-JAM, GATE, and CEED, depending on the programme. Doctoral and MA admissions are through entrance examinations and interviews.

As of August 2024, the institute had 8,533 students on its rolls, of whom 24.5 percent were women. The faculty numbered 456, of whom 12.1 percent were women.

=== Rankings ===
University and college rankings

General – international
- QS (World) (2025): 344
- QS (Asia) (2023): 124

General – India
- NIRF (Overall) (2024): 9
- NIRF (Research) (2024): 10

Engineering – India
- NIRF (2024): 7

In the QS World University Rankings 2025, IIT Guwahati was ranked 344th globally. In the National Institutional Ranking Framework (NIRF) 2024, it was ranked ninth overall among Indian universities and seventh among engineering institutions.

=== Research infrastructure ===
IIT Guwahati hosts Param Ishan, a supercomputer deployed in collaboration with the Centre for Development of Advanced Computing, which upon installation was described as the fastest supercomputer in the northeastern, eastern, and southern regions of India.

== Collaborations ==
IIT Guwahati partnered with NTPC Limited to design and develop a plant for capturing carbon dioxide from power plants, led by Prof. Bishnupada Mandal of the Department of Chemical Engineering.

== Student life ==
=== Festivals ===
IIT Guwahati organises several annual student-run festivals. Alcheringa is the annual cultural festival, first held in 1996. Techniche is the annual techno-management festival held each September, which also hosts Technothlon, a national-level examination for school students, and the Guwahati Half Marathon. Other festivals include Spirit (sports), Udgam (entrepreneurship summit), and Prayatna (socio-welfare fest).

== Faculty and alumni ==
=== Notable faculty ===
- Dhirendra Nath Buragohain (founding director, 1994 to 2003): A civil engineering professor from IIT Bombay who established the institute. He was a member of the Scientific Advisory Committee to the Cabinet, Government of India (1998-2002), and received a Doctor of Letters (honoris causa) from the National Institute of Technology, Meghalaya in 2021.
- Gautam Biswas (director, 2013 to 2019): A mechanical engineer recognised for his research in computational fluid mechanics and heat transfer. He received the ASME Heat Transfer Memorial Award (2023) and was awarded an honorary doctorate by the Aristotle University of Thessaloniki in 2021.
- T. G. Sitharam (director, 2019 to 2022): A geotechnical engineer from IISc Bangalore who subsequently served as chairman of the All India Council for Technical Education from December 2022.

=== Notable alumni ===
- Vivek Ramachandran: An electronics and communication engineering graduate, Ramachandran is a cybersecurity researcher who discovered the Caffe Latte attack on WEP wireless networks. He founded Pentester Academy, a cybersecurity training platform that served customers from government agencies and Fortune 500 companies in over 140 countries before its acquisition by INE in 2021. He subsequently founded SquareX, a browser-based cybersecurity company that raised $6 million in seed funding from Sequoia Capital Southeast Asia in 2023.
- Prabhat Gupta: A computer science graduate, Gupta co-founded TravelTriangle, an online holiday marketplace, in 2011 alongside Sankalp Agarwal (IIT Kharagpur) and Sanchit Garg (IIT Bombay). The company raised over $46 million in venture funding.

== See also ==
- UCEED
- List of universities in India
- Education in India
