= Techniche =

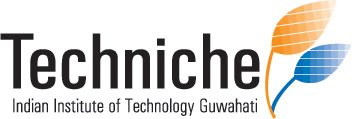
- Ideate, Nurture, Kindle
- Genre: Techno-Management festival
- Location: Indian Institute of Technology Guwahati
- Founded: 1999
- Major events: Technothlon, Guwahati Half-Marathon, Nexus, Lecture Series, Exhibitions, Workshops, Competitions, Escalade, Robocalypse and Funniche.
- Filing status: Non-Profit Student Organization
- Slogan: Celebrating Innovation through revolutionizing technology
- Website: techniche.org.in

Techniche is the annual Techno-Management festival of Indian Institute of Technology (IIT), Guwahati. The festival was started in 1999 by Dhirendra Sinha, a Mechanical Engineering B Tech student along with a group of students within the IIT Guwahati campus. Spread over three days and four nights, Techniche is generally conducted towards the end of August each year.

== Brief history ==
Beginning its journey in two rooms within the Technology Complex of IIT Guwahati (How Techniche got started), Techniche has grown exponentially over the years, spreading its wings to nearly 50K participants from varied colleges, schools and institutions all across India, UAE, Bangladesh and Singapore. It has been successful in promoting and honing scientific and entrepreneurial skills in the academia.

The symbol of Techniche is two pixelated saplings, orange and blue in color. The saplings are the portrayal of how Techniche integrates the youth from all around the country While the blue color stands for the management face, the orange represents the technological front of Techniche. The symbol was designed by Tanuj Shah in the year 2005, a student of IIT Guwahati Department of Design (Batch 2006).

== Events ==
Techniche hosts a varied range of events, both inspiring as well as kindling the fire in enthusiasts. An outline of the events is briefed below.

=== Nexus ===
Nexus (formerly Industrial Conclave) forges ahead as an ideal interface between the industry and the students to inspire, motivate and train them for the battle for success in life. It provides a quintessential platform for young entrepreneurs and budding businessmen to broaden their horizons and understand the internal dynamics of the ever-growing industry. The event strives to create an atmosphere charged with knowledge of the management world and soft skills needed to ace it.

The event comprises the following sub-events:

1. Keynotes

2. Panel Discussion

3. Soft Skills Workshop

4. Case-a-thon

5. Interactive Session

6. Competitions

=== Technothlon ===
Technothlon is an international school championship for classes 9th to 12th, organized by the student fraternity of IIT Guwahati. It began its journey in 2004 with an aim to ‘Inspire Young Minds’. Starting with a participation of 200 students, over the past 11 years Technothlon has reached to over 250 cities in India and various centers abroad with 2.5 lakh students avidly following it. Through a series of events involving mental aptitude, logic, and dexterity, it seeks to provide school students a platform to build fundamental experience and knowledge, to exercise co-ordination skills, and to think out of the box. Its preliminary round consists of a written round which will test the student's critical thinking skills. The test is conducted throughout several centers in India. The final stage is conducted in IIT Guwahati during Techniche, where selected students are tested in a series of events.

=== Lecture Series ===
The Lecture Series module provides a platform to hear keynote lectures from individuals across the globe. Over the years, Techniche has hosted eminent personalities like:

- John C. Mather (The 2006 Physics Nobel Laureate)
- Daniel Domscheit-Berg (German Technology Activist)
- Jean Baptiste Kempf (President, VideoLAN)
- Dr. Claude Nicollier (Swiss Astronaut, European Space Agency)
- Anousheh Ansari (Chairwoman, Prodea Systems)
- Vikas Swarup (Indian writer and diplomat)
- Lyn Evans (Project leader, Large Hadron Collider)
- Pranav Mistry (Global Senior Vice President of Research, Samsung)
- Stephen P. Morse (Architect of the Intel 8086 chip)
- Richard Stallman (Founder, GNU and Free Software Foundation)
- Walter Bender (researcher and executive director, MIT Media Lab)
- Peter Atkins (British Chemist at University of Oxford and renowned author)
- Christer Fuglesang (Swedish Astronaut, European Space Agency)
- Ronen Sen (Indian diplomat)
- Casey Hudson (Canadian video game developer)
- Tessy Thomas (Project Director, Agni-IV, Defence Research and Development Organisation)
- Dr.Kota Harinarayana (President, Aeronautical Society of India)
- Kiran Bedi (Indian Police Service officer, First woman to join IPS)
- Brooks Moore (Narrator, How It's Made)
- Jeff Liebermann (Host, Time Warp)
- Lars Krutak (American anthropologist and Host, Tattoo Hunter)
- Yashavant Kanetkar (Indian Computer Scientist and renowned author)

=== Competitions ===
A wide range of exciting, mind-bending challenges are conducted during the main event, as part of the robotics, Tech-Olympics and corporate modules.

=== Workshops ===
As stated by them an integral part of Techniche's mission is to introduce a new generation of students to the latest technological developments in various fields. The workshops are organized and conducted by technical experts. They draw interested students.

Workshops in the sixteenth edition of Techniche witnessed huge participation, as the edition brought forward a wide variety of technological spheres including Biped and Swarm robotics, Eye Robotics, Ethical Hacking and Cyber Forensics, Android development, KUKA Agilus, Cloud Computing, Vehicle Overhauling and Twenty19 Intern workshops.

As part of the twenty-first edition, a wide variety of events will be conducted, encompassing a diverse set of topics, from Machine Learning and Artificial Intelligence, and Humanoid Robotics to Stock Market and Social Media Marketing.

== Social initiatives ==
Over the years, Techniche has conducted various campaigns which have been very successful in bringing a positive change to society. Here are some of the initiatives undertaken in the past few editions.

=== Guwahati Half Marathon (GHM) ===
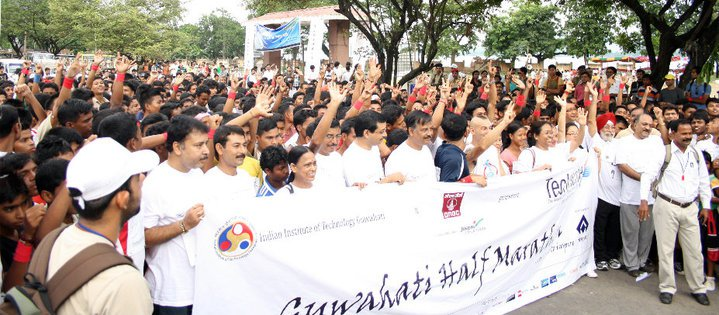
Guwahati Half Marathon

The Guwahati half marathon initiative was started on 30 August 2009 with an aim to unify the north-east. It witnessed a huge participation in the two events proposed in the debutante year – The Glory Run (18 km) and The Dream Run (6 km). In 2010, Techniche introduced a 21-km cycle race with the motto of shaping the youth's attitude towards the environment with the motto "Youth for environment". As the years unfolded, the initiative grew, now standing as the largest of its kind in north-east India. For the first time, a new category of marathon was introduced, namely, the Courage Run for specially-abled participants.

The illustrious Amit Kumar Saroha, Shimit Amin, and Rakeysh Omprakash Mehra were invited to spread the marathon's motto "Run for Peace" (in 2015), "Run to affect the shift" (in 2014) and "Run for a better tomorrow" (in 2013) respectively. Their support was integral in drawing large crowds to the event. Special attendees to the event include singer Zublee Baruah, cricketer Akash Chopra and the world's largest parkour group "American Parkour", and a coverage of the events were provided by Assam Tribune and NDTV India. Later in 2014, a college championship was also introduced to inspire young students to hone their athletic skills.

=== Pragati ===
This initiative, pioneered during Techniche 2015, was inspired by the Government of India's call for every IIT to adopt a neighbouring village, with the vision of transformational change in rural India. The students from the IIT campus undertake several developmental projects in the rural villages of Assam. One of these is the setting up of bio-toilets and clean drinking facilities in the villages, an important step towards achieving the vision of a smart village. Also, in collaboration with the Technical Board of IIT Guwahati and support from NGOs, energy efficient, solar street lights were installed in the villages.

Another important facet of the initiative is its mission to educate schoolchildren in rural areas and make them conversant in modern technology. Students from the IIT campus visit the rural villages of Assam, including the campus' adopted village of Lathiya Bagicha, and educate the elementary schoolchildren on fundamental subjects like science, using simple experiments and projects. The adults of the village were helped in other ways, like teaching them about cashless transactions. Some of the villages covered under this initiative are Dolibari, Dadara, Singimari and Hajo.

=== Wake Up and Vote ===
The Wake Up and Vote campaign was launched in the wake of the 2014 Indian General Election, in order to build awareness among citizens about their right to vote, and how they could exercise that right. Organized in cities as well as towns, the initiative has reached over 2 lakh people, as of 2018. The initiative has been endorsed by celebrities like Mary Kom and Sushmita Sen. A video-making competition was also organized as a part of this initiative.

=== Muskaan ===
An attempt to lighten up special hearts on the occasion of Diwali, Techniche invites children from the Shishugram Orphanage to the IIT Guwahati campus. Here, they participate in and are taught activities like lantern-making and diya painting. A Rangoli competition is also organized as a part of the initiative. Techniche organized the third edition of MUSKAAN in IIT Guwahati with the theme "Spreading Smiles".

=== Litre of Light ===
"Lighten up someone's life and you have at-least lightened some part of the world". The Litre of Light campaign was initiated to illuminate the homes and streets of the rural areas of Assam.

On 9 March 2014, team Techniche successfully organized the "Litre of Light" event in the Bhutnath slum locality near Guwahati city. The invention, being relatively simple, involves filling up a 1.5-litre PET bottle with purified water and bleach and installing it onto the roof of a house. As the water inside the bottle refracts the sunlight during the daytime, it creates the same intensity as a 55-watt light bulb used in modern houses. Economic and eco-friendly lights like these were set up in multiple households in the locality

In 2018, over 100 LED street lights were set up in over 50 villages, providing around 40-45% in energy and monetary savings. Also, over 50 low-cost, easy to install lights were placed in rural homes across Assam.

=== Blood donation camp ===
Recognized by the National AIDS Control Organization (NACO), this student campaign raises awareness on the importance of blood donation. As a part of the initiative, the team conducts blood donation camps in the IIT Guwahati Hospital, during the three days of the festival.

=== Health Camp ===
The initiative aims at inspiring the local people about health. The volunteers, with the help of few medical practitioners, roam in the nearby villages wherein proper hospital facilities are set up and provide free medical services.
