= Heel–ball index =

Forensic measurement of the human foot

The heel–ball index of the human foot is the ratio of the maximum breadth of the heel multiplied by 100 and divided by the breadth at the ball region.

This index was developed by Kewal Krishan, Tanuj Kanchan, Neelam Passi and John A. DiMaggio in 2012 while working on a sample of 303 North Indians. It has been shown that the index shows sexual dimorphism, as it was found to be greater in females than males. This index can be used as a tool for sex determination in forensic and medico-legal examinations of human remains as well as a new trait in studying the population variability in biological anthropology.

It may be helpful to forensic anthropologists, forensic scientists, forensic podiatrists and anatomists in forensic casework and conducting further research on the human foot.
