= Gautam Biswas =

Indian academic (born 1956)

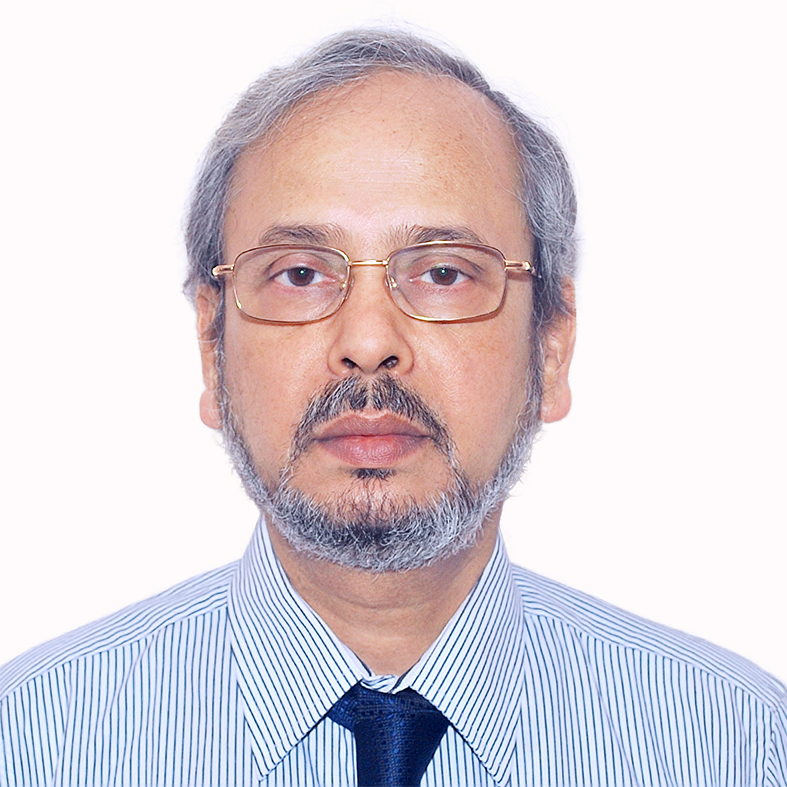
- Born: 23 May 1956 (age 70)
- Education: B.E. College under University of Calcutta (B.E. 1979) and IIT Kharagpur (M.Tech. 1981 and PhD 1985). Distinguished Alumnus award was given by both the Institutes.
- Awards: J C Bose National Fellowship; Institute Fellow of IIT Kanpur; Distinguished Teacher Award of IIT Kanpur; 2023 ASME Heat Transfer Memorial Award
- Scientific career
- Fields: Fluid Mechanics, Convective Heat Transfer, Computational Fluid Dynamics, Drops and Bubbles, Microfluidics.
- Workplaces: Indian Institute of Technology Kanpur, CSIR-CMERI Durgapur and Indian Institute of Technology Guwahati.
- Website: home.iitk.ac.in/~gtm

Gautam Biswas (Bengali: গৌতম বিশ্বাস; born 23 May 1956) is an academic serving as a Senior Professor Emeritus in Mechanical Engineering at BITS Pilani, K. K. Birla Goa Campus from January 2025. Earlier, Prof. Biswas served as the director of Indian Institute of Technology (IIT) Guwahati, and director of the CSIR - Central Mechanical Engineering Research Institute at Durgapur. He was the G.D. and V.M. Mehta Endowed Chair Professor, and Dean of Academic Affairs at IIT Kanpur. His total tenure in various capacities at the Indian Institute of Technology Kanpur lasted from 1990 to 2024.

== Education ==
Biswas completed his B.E. from IIEST (formerly B.E. College under Calcutta University) in 1979 and his PhD from the Indian Institute of Technology Kharagpur in 1985. He was a Alexander von Humboldt Fellow at the Ruhr University Bochum in Germany and JSPS Invitation Fellow at the Yokohama National University, Japan. Biswas is a Fellow of the Indian National Science Academy (INSA, New Delhi), the Indian Academy of Sciences (IAS, Bangalore), and the National Academy of Sciences India (NASI, Allahabad). He is also a Fellow of the Indian National Academy of Engineering (INAE) and the Institution of Engineers (IEI).

== Research ==
Biswas has contributed to the fields of heat transfer and fluid mechanics. His work on enhancing heat transfer using delta-winglet type vortex generators has been included in international textbooks. The concept has been used by industry for various HAVC systems. Additionally, he has contributed to the understanding of bluff body flows. His investigations on proper orthogonal decomposition (POD) to analyse coherent structures in turbulent flows and large-eddy simulation of flow and heat transfer in impinging jets have been admired by the scientific community. Biswas's contributions pertaining to handling free surface flows and some of his investigations related to the prediction of bubble growth in film boiling have been recognized. Biswas and co-researchers analyzed the impact of falling drops on a liquid surface and contributed to the understanding of partial coalescence and the transition between coalescence and splashing. Experimental evidence of large bubble entrapment occurring outside the traditional small region on the V-D map, made the boundary of large bubble entrapment a topic of interest. His group probed the zone of large bubble entrapment and underlying physics. He has published on the formation of air bubbles from a submerged orifice. His group analyzed the impact of a train of high-speed micro-drops on a deep liquid pool and explained a mechanistic route leading to the creation of a deep cavity inside the liquid pool. Biswas and co-researchers contributed to understanding that EMT cells are more drug-resistant, with a two-fold higher expression of the multi-drug resistance (MDR1) gene.

== Awards ==
- Biswas was awarded an honorary doctorate by the National Institute of Technology Agartala in 2017.
- He was conferred an honorary doctorate by the Aristotle University of Thessaloniki, Greece, in 2018.
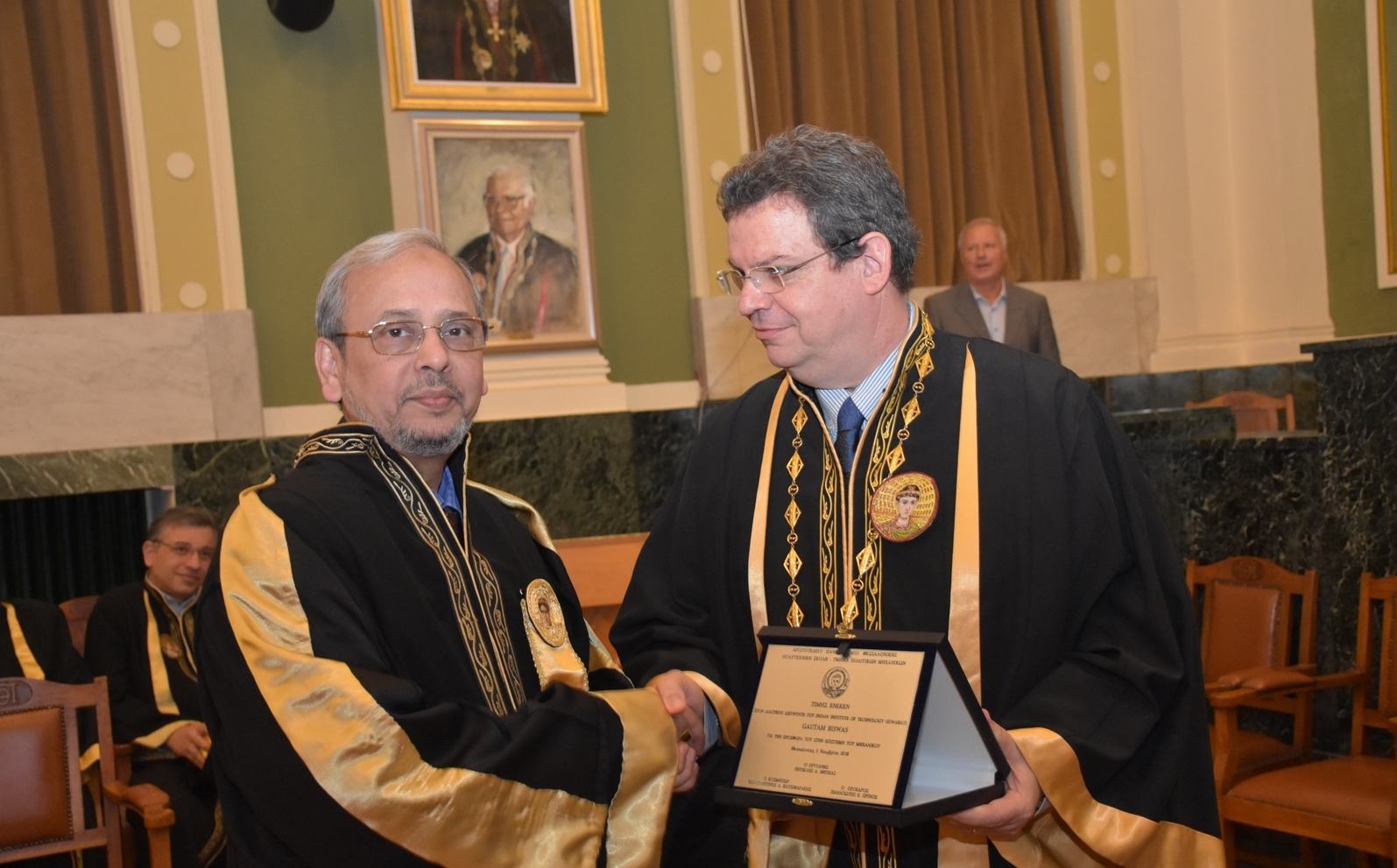
  Prof. Gautam Biswas receiving the Honorary Doctorate awarded by the Aristotle University of Thessaloniki, Greece on November 2, 2018
- IIT Kanpur awarded Biswas the Institute Fellow award for the year 2020.
- In recognition of his teaching, IIT Kanpur conferred the Distinguished Teacher Award upon Biswas in 2022.
- Biswas received the 2023 ASME Heat Transfer Memorial Award in the Science Category for contributions to thermal science and engineering, including heat transfer enhancement, phase change heat transfer with and without electrohydrodynamic forces, and the dynamics of liquid jet and droplet impingement.
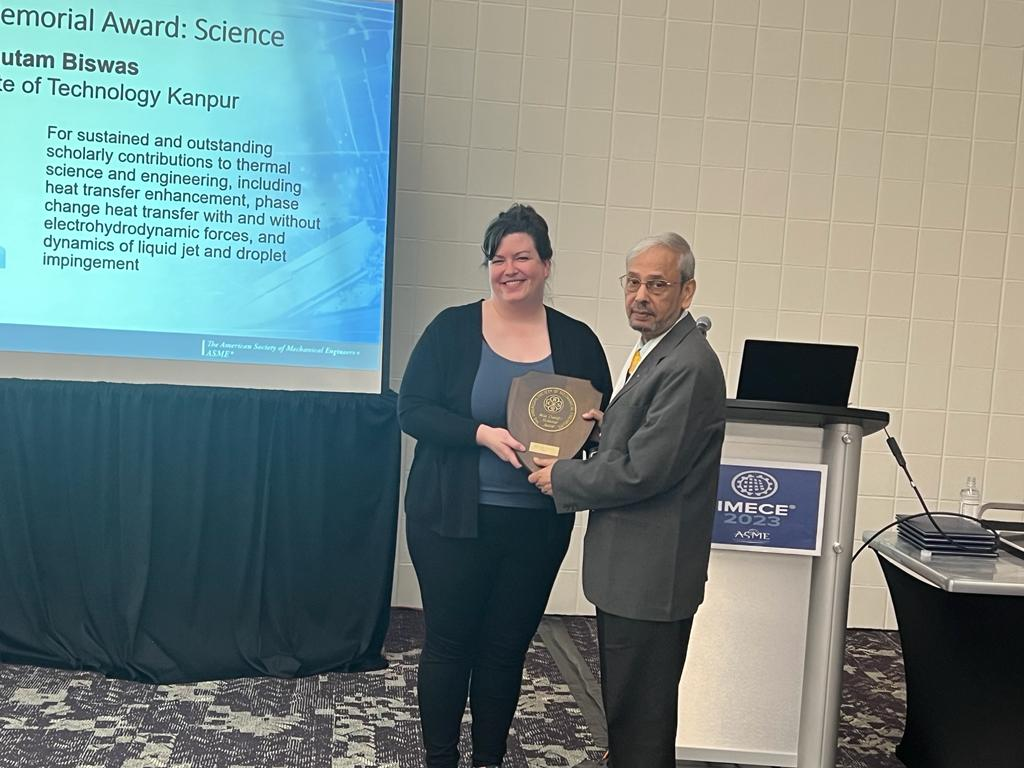
  Prof. Biswas receiving the ASME Heat Transfer Memorial Award in the Science Category on October 31, 2023 at the Convention Center, New Orleans, USA
- In 2011, he was awarded the J C Bose National Fellowship by the Science and Engineering Research Board (DST), Government of India.

== Administration ==
- Organizing Chairman, Graduate Aptitude Test in Engineering - 2001
- Dean of Academic Affairs, IIT Kanpur (Jan 2003 - Dec 2005)
- Director, CSIR - Central Mechanical Engineering Research Institute (CMERI), Durgapur and Ludhiana (2009 - Aug 2013)
- Founder Director, Academy of Scientific and Innovative Research (AcSIR) (2010 - Aug 2013)
- Director, Indian Institute of Technology Guwahati (Sept 2013 - June 2019)
