= Ritika Verma =

Indian social worker and volunteer (born 1998)

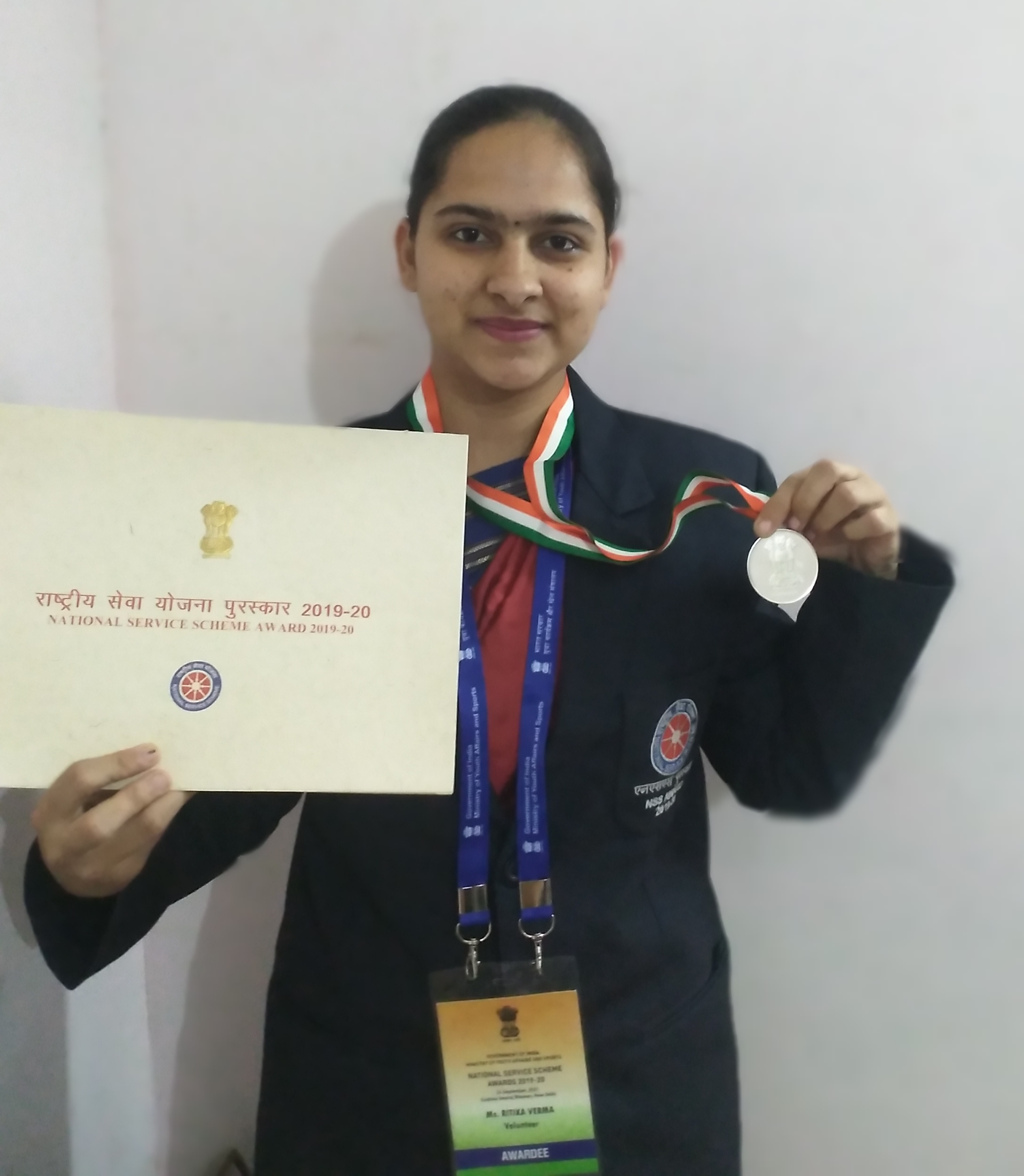
- Ritika Verma with National Service Scheme award 2019-20
- Born: 4 November 1998 (age 27); Chandigarh
- Citizenship: Indian

Academic background
- Education: MSc Anthropology (honours)
- Alma mater: Panjab University
- Academic advisor: Kewal Krishan

Ritika Verma (born 4 November 1998) is an Indian social worker and National Service Scheme volunteer who has been awarded the prestigious National Service Scheme Award by Ram Nath Kovind, the president of India in 2021.

Ritika got this award due to her excellent services on various social issues and causes as an NSS volunteer. She is well known for her services for community sensitization during COVID-19 pandemic.

== Education ==
Ritika is a Phd student of Panjab University Chandigarh India and has passed M.Sc. Anthropology with distinction.
