= T. G. Sitharam =

Professor at IISc Bengaluru

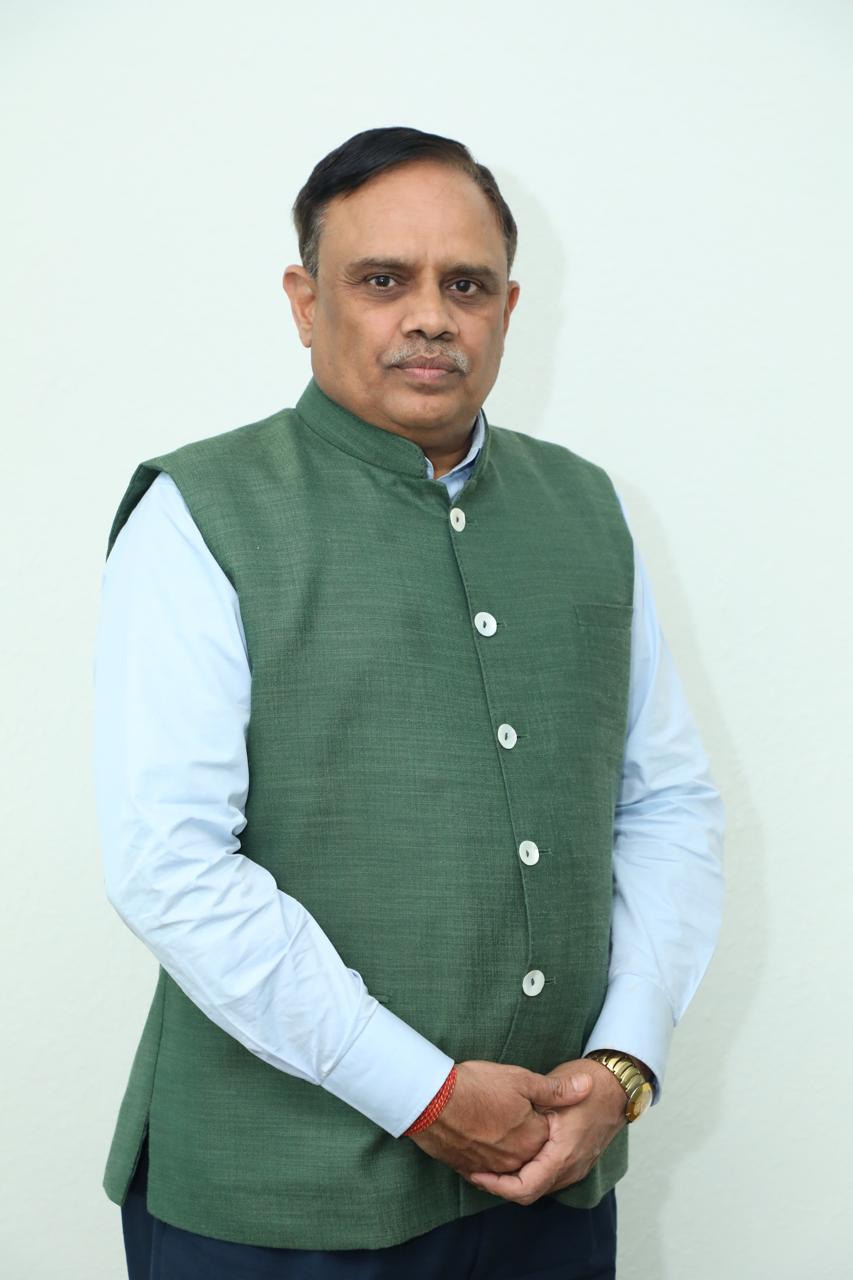

Honorary professor, Indian Institute of Science Bangalore
- In office 28 June 2006 – 2031

Ex-Chairman, All India Council for Technical Education (AICTE)
- In office 22 November 2022 – 20 December 2025

Ex-Director at
- In office 2019–2022

Personal details
- Born: 17 May 1961 (age 65) Karnataka
- Education: Indian Institute of Science Bangalore; University of Waterloo
- Profession: Professor; Author; Consultant
- Known for: Rock mechanics Earthquake engineering
- Website: Official website

T. G. Sitharam (born 17 May 1961) is a civil engineer, professor at IISc Bangalore (on lien), former director at IIT Guwahati. He has served as Chairman of the All India Council for Technical Education from 2022 to 2025. He is known for his works in the fields of rock mechanics, rock engineering and geotechnical earthquake engineering. He is an elected fellow of Indian Geotechnical Society, Institution of Engineers (India) and the American Society of Civil Engineers.

He is currently serving as the editor-in-chief of Springer Transactions in Civil and Environmental Engineering and several other journals, Chairman, Board of Governors, NIFTEM-T, Thanjavur, TN (an Institute of National Importance) 2026-2029, MoFPI, Govt of India, Member, Member, National Council for Science Museums (NCSM) Society, Ministry of Culture, Govt. of India, Honorary Professor, Indian Institute of Science, Bangalore ( 2026 -2031)

== Awards and honors ==
- S.P. Research Award (SAARC) (1998)
- Prof. Gopal Ranjan Research Award (2014)
- The Amulya and Vimala Reddy Lecture Award (2014)
- IGS Kueckelmann Award (2015)
- Sir M Visvesvaraya State Award for Senior Scientists
- Listed in world ranking of top 2% Indian Scientist in Geological & Geomatics Engineering 2020, 2021, 2022, 2023, 2024 and 2025

== Selected articles ==
- Naveen, B.P.; Mahapatra, Durga Madhab; Sitharam, T.G.; Sivapullaiah, P.V.; Ramachandra, T.V. (January 2017). "Physico-chemical and biological characterization of urban municipal landfill leachate". Environmental Pollution. 220 (Pt A): 1–12. Bibcode:2017EPoll.220....1N. doi:10.1016/j.envpol.2016.09.002. PMID 27616651.
- Sireesh, S.; Sitharam, T.G.; Dash, Sujit Kumar (April 2009). "Bearing capacity of circular footing on geocell–sand mattress overlying clay bed with void". Geotextiles and Geomembranes. 27 (2): 89–98. Bibcode:2009GtGm...27...89S. doi:10.1016/j.geotexmem.2008.09.005.
- Sitharam, T.G; Latha, G.Madhavi (June 2002). "Simulation of excavations in jointed rock masses using a practical equivalent continuum approach". International Journal of Rock Mechanics and Mining Sciences. 39 (4): 517–525. Bibcode:2002IJRMM..39..517S. doi:10.1016/S1365-1609(02)00024-2.

== Books ==
- Sitharam, T. G.; Govindaraju, L. (2016). Elasticity for Engineers. I.K. International Publishing House Pvt. Limited. ISBN 978-93-85909-34-4.
- Samui, Pijush; Das, Sarat; Sitharam, T.G. (2010). Soft Computing: in Geotechnical Engineering. VDM Verlag Dr. Müller. p. 112. ISBN 978-3639311259.
- Sitharam, T. G. (2008). Geotechnical Engineering (Soil Mechanics). S. Chand Publishing. ISBN 978-81-219-2457-3.
