= Faculty Research Awards =

Awards for academics in India

Faculty Research Awards is an annual award instituted by Careers360 to recognise academic and research faculty in India. Winners are selected on the basis of their research output in Scopus-indexed journals, citation index, and h-index. The award carries a cash prize and a citation.

== 2018 ==
Faculty Research Awards 2018 were awarded to academic researchers across 24 disciplines by the Indian Union Minister of Human Resource Development Prakash Javadekar on 20 March in New Delhi. The awards were hosted by Careers360. The awards recognise the efforts of those in the field of academic research in India.

The awardees were chosen on the basis of their academic and research output in Scopus-indexed journals, citation index, and h-index for the period 2015–17.

== 2023 ==
The second edition of the Faculty Research Awards was held on 6 October 2023 at the auditorium of the Prime Ministers' Museum and Library, Teen Murti House, New Delhi. Awards were presented to 81 researchers across 27 disciplines from institutions including the IITs, NITs, Banaras Hindu University, AIIMS, the University of Delhi, and several private universities.

The awards were presented by Devusinh Chauhan, Union Minister of State for Communications, as chief guest, with T. G. Sitharam, chairman of the All India Council for Technical Education, as guest of honour. Of the 81 awardees, 30 from public institutions and 27 from private institutions received "Outstanding Faculty Awards", while a further 24 scholars received "Commendable Faculty Awards".

Candidates were evaluated on publication counts in Scopus-indexed journals, citation counts, and h-index, weighted at 33.5%, 31.6%, and 34.9% respectively, with a minimum of ten publications required for consideration. Researchers were identified using sources including Stanford University's list of the top 2% of scientists and the website Research.com.

At the ceremony, Careers360 released a white paper, Research in Indian Academic Institutions and Top 1,000 Researchers of India, listing 1,000 researchers across the same 27 disciplines from more than 400 academic institutions.
