= H2AFY =

Protein-coding gene in the species Homo sapiens

MACROH2A1
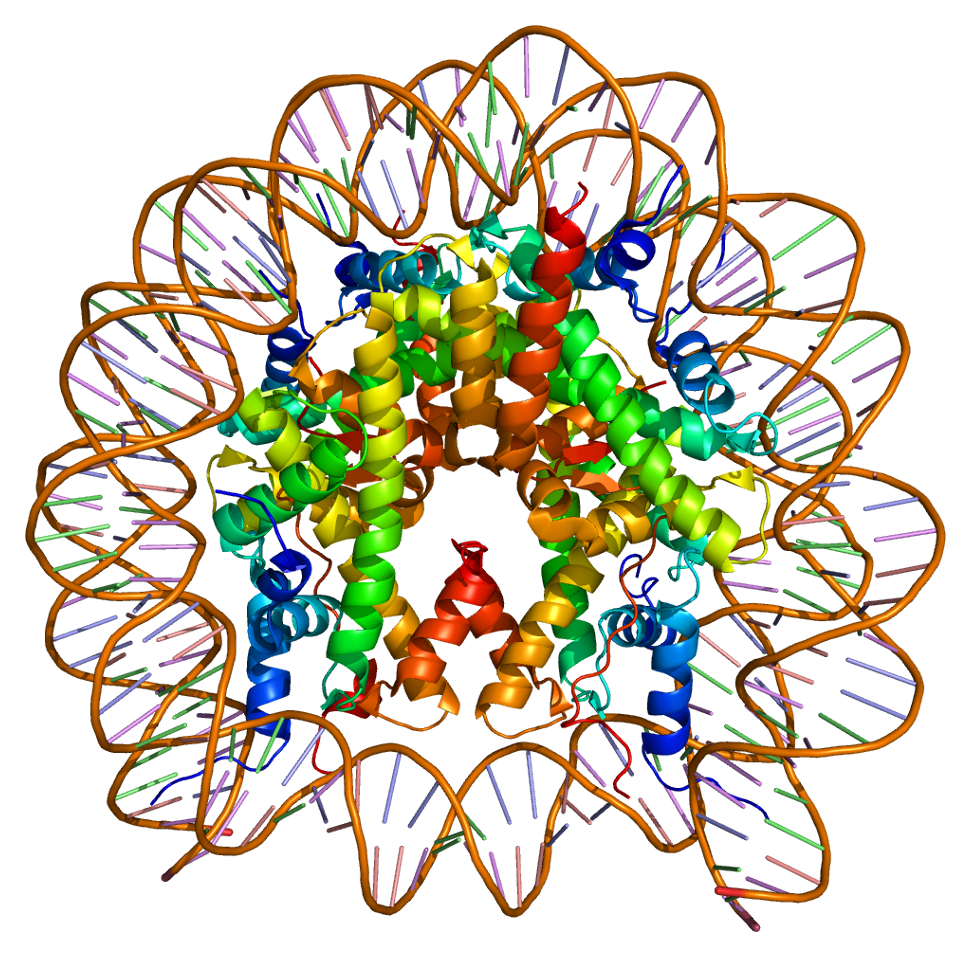

Identifiers
- Aliases: MACROH2A1, H2A.y, H2A/y, H2AF12M, H2AFJ, MACROH2A1.1, mH2A1, macroH2A1.2, H2A histone family member Y, H2AFY, macroH2A.1 histone
- External IDs: OMIM: 610054; MGI: 1349392; GeneCards: MACROH2A1
Available structures
PDB	Ortholog search: PDBe RCSB
PDB	List of PDB id codes 1U35, 1ZR3, 1ZR5, 2F8N, 2FXK, 3HQH, 3HSV, 3IID, 3IIF, 3IVB, 5IIT

Gene location (Human)
Chr.	Chromosome 5 (human)
Band	5q31.1	Start	135,334,381 bp
Band	5q31.1	End	135,399,914 bp

Gene location (Mouse)
Chr.	Chromosome 13 (mouse)
Band	13|13 B1	Start	56,221,432 bp
Band	13|13 B1	End	56,284,174 bp
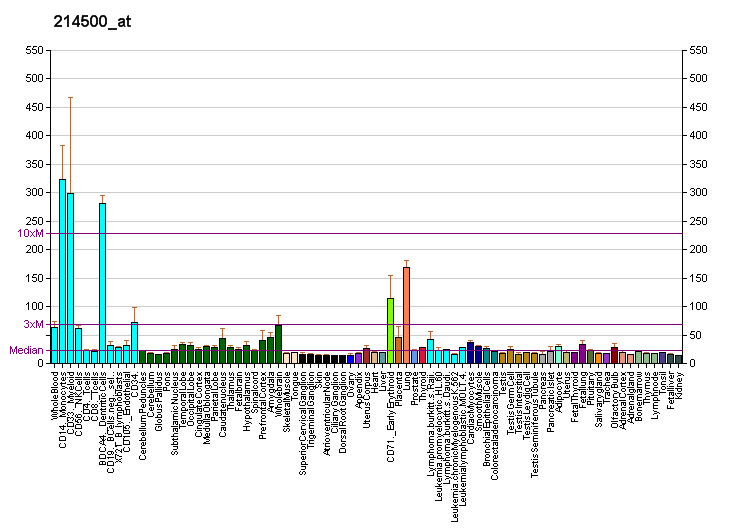

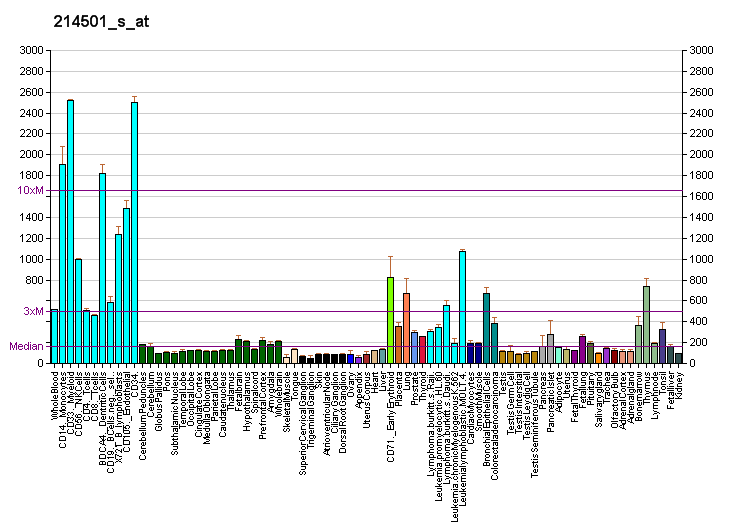

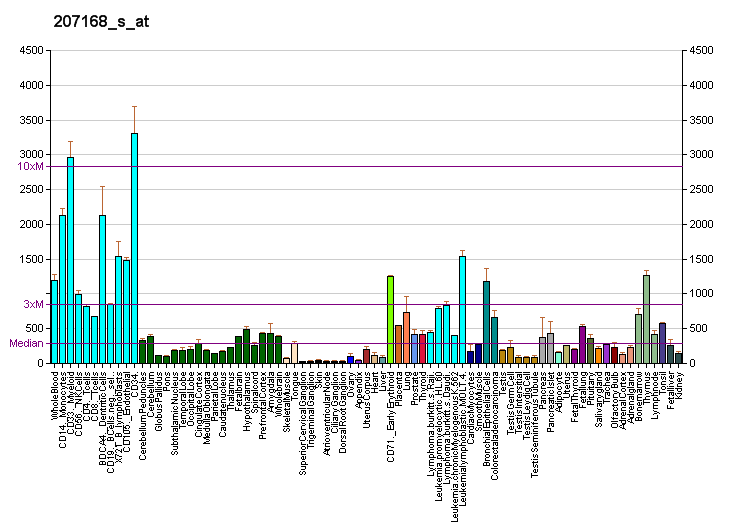
RNA expression pattern
Bgee	Human / Mouse (ortholog); Top expressed in: epithelium of nasopharynx; monocyte; mucosa of pharynx; human penis; trabecular bone; ganglionic eminence; buccal mucosa cell; amniotic fluid; palpebral conjunctiva; lower lobe of lung / Top expressed in: saccule; otic vesicle; Rostral migratory stream; otic placode; internal carotid artery; somite; ventricular zone; ganglionic eminence; mandibular prominence; maxillary prominence; More reference expression data
BioGPS	More reference expression data
Gene ontology
Molecular function	protein kinase binding; rDNA binding; protein serine/threonine kinase inhibitor activity; RNA polymerase II transcription regulatory region sequence-specific DNA binding; chromatin binding; double-stranded methylated DNA binding; protein heterodimerization activity; RNA polymerase II core promoter sequence-specific DNA binding; core promoter sequence-specific DNA binding; DNA binding; chromatin DNA binding; enzyme binding; protein binding; nucleosomal DNA binding; promoter-specific chromatin binding
Cellular component	extracellular exosome; ESC/E(Z) complex; nucleolus; condensed chromosome; chromosome; pericentric heterochromatin; nucleosome; nucleus; nuclear chromosome; sex chromatin; Barr body; chromatin
Biological process	negative regulation of histone H3-K4 methylation; regulation of ribosomal DNA heterochromatin assembly; dosage compensation; negative regulation of cell cycle G2/M phase transition; epigenetic maintenance of chromatin in transcription-competent conformation; regulation of cell growth; positive regulation of keratinocyte differentiation; negative regulation of protein serine/threonine kinase activity; negative regulation of transcription by RNA polymerase II; nucleosome assembly; negative regulation of protein localization to chromosome, telomeric region; negative regulation of gene expression, epigenetic; negative regulation of histone H3-K27 methylation; regulation of gene expression, epigenetic; positive regulation of maintenance of mitotic sister chromatid cohesion; establishment of protein localization to chromatin; negative regulation of transcription of nucleolar large rRNA by RNA polymerase I; regulation of lipid metabolic process; regulation of response to oxidative stress; negative regulation of response to oxidative stress; positive regulation of response to oxidative stress; chromatin organization
Sources:Amigo / QuickGO
Orthologs
Databases	NCBI: entry; OMA: entry
Species	Human	Mouse
Entrez	9555	26914
Ensembl	ENSG00000113648	ENSMUSG00000015937
UniProt	O75367	Q9QZQ8
RefSeq (mRNA)	NM_001040158; NM_004893; NM_138609; NM_138610	NM_001159513; NM_001159514; NM_001159515; NM_012015
RefSeq (protein)	NP_001035248; NP_004884; NP_613075; NP_613258	NP_001152985; NP_001152986; NP_001152987; NP_036145
Location (UCSC)	Chr 5: 135.33 – 135.4 Mb	Chr 13: 56.22 – 56.28 Mb
PubMed search
- Wikidata
View/Edit Human	View/Edit Mouse

Core histone macro-H2A.1 is a protein that in humans is encoded by the H2AFY gene.

== Function ==
Histones are basic nuclear proteins that are responsible for the nucleosome structure of the chromosomal fiber in eukaryotes. Nucleosomes consist of approximately 146 bp of DNA wrapped around a histone octamer composed of pairs of each of the four core histones (H2A, H2B, H3, and H4). The chromatin fiber is further compacted through the interaction of a linker histone, H1, with the DNA between the nucleosomes to form higher order chromatin structures. This gene encodes a member of the histone H2A family. It replaces conventional H2A histones in a subset of nucleosomes where it represses transcription and participates in stable X chromosome inactivation. Alternative splicing results in multiple transcript variants encoding different isoforms. Expression of these isoforms is associated to several cancers, such as hepatocellular carcinoma.
