= ELF4 =

Protein-coding gene in humans

Identifiers
- Aliases: ELF4, ELFR, MEF, E74 like ETS transcription factor 4, AIFBL2
- External IDs: OMIM: 300775; MGI: 1928377; GeneCards: ELF4

Gene location (Human)
Chr.	X chromosome (human)
Band	Xq26.1	Start	130,063,955 bp
Band	Xq26.1	End	130,110,716 bp

Gene location (Mouse)
Chr.	X chromosome (mouse)
Band	X|X A5	Start	47,499,923 bp
Band	X|X A5	End	47,552,009 bp
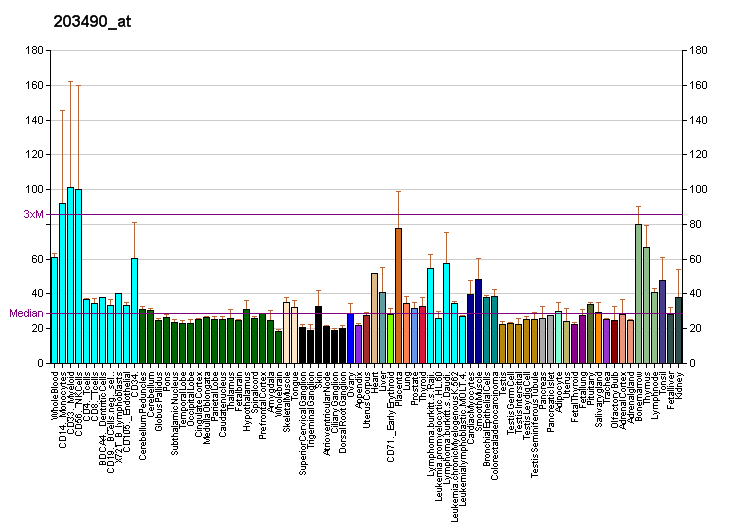

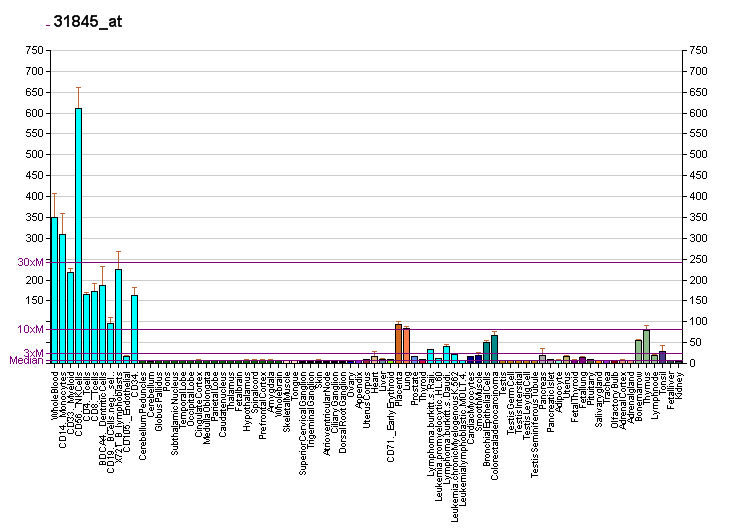
RNA expression pattern
Bgee	Human / Mouse (ortholog); Top expressed in: granulocyte; blood; mononuclear cell; monocyte; cartilage tissue; germinal epithelium; mucosa of transverse colon; mucosa of ileum; jejunal mucosa; mucosa of sigmoid colon / Top expressed in: granulocyte; ascending aorta; aortic valve; urethra; male urethra; tibiofemoral joint; thymus; genital tubercle; lip; tail of embryo; More reference expression data
BioGPS	More reference expression data
Gene ontology
Molecular function	RNA polymerase II cis-regulatory region sequence-specific DNA binding; DNA-binding transcription factor activity; DNA binding; sequence-specific DNA binding; DNA-binding transcription activator activity, RNA polymerase II-specific; protein binding; DNA-binding transcription factor activity, RNA polymerase II-specific
Cellular component	PML body; nucleus; nucleoplasm; nuclear body
Biological process	natural killer cell proliferation; positive regulation of transcription, DNA-templated; NK T cell proliferation; cell differentiation; innate immune response; regulation of transcription, DNA-templated; transcription, DNA-templated; positive regulation of transcription by RNA polymerase II; transcription by RNA polymerase II; regulation of transcription by RNA polymerase II
Sources:Amigo / QuickGO
Orthologs
Databases	NCBI: entry; OMA: entry
Species	Human	Mouse
Entrez	2000	56501
Ensembl	ENSG00000102034	ENSMUSG00000031103
UniProt	Q99607	Q9Z2U4
RefSeq (mRNA)	NM_001127197; NM_001421	NM_019680; NM_001381876
RefSeq (protein)	NP_001120669; NP_001412	NP_062654; NP_001368805
Location (UCSC)	Chr X: 130.06 – 130.11 Mb	Chr X: 47.5 – 47.55 Mb
PubMed search
- Wikidata
View/Edit Human	View/Edit Mouse

ETS-related transcription factor Elf-4 is a protein that in humans is encoded by the ELF4 gene.
