= Encyclopedia of Forensic and Legal Medicine 2nd Edition =

The Encyclopedia of Forensic and Legal Medicine 2nd Edition is an encyclopedia of forensics and medico-legal knowledge published by Academic Press, Elsevier in 2016.
