= ELF3 =

Plant-specific gene

EARLY FLOWERING 3

Identifiers
- Organism: Arabidopsis thaliana
- Symbol: ELF3
- Alt. symbols: PYK20
- Entrez: 817134
- Orthologs: NCBI: entry; OMA: entry
- RefSeq (mRNA): NM_128153.3
- RefSeq (Prot): NP_180164.1
- UniProt: O82804

Other data
- Chromosome: 2: 11.06 - 11.06 Mb
Search for
- Structures: Swiss-model
- Domains: InterPro

EARLY FLOWERING 3 (ELF3) is a plant-specific gene that encodes the hydroxyproline-rich glycoprotein and is required for the function of the circadian clock. ELF3 is one of the three components that make up the Evening Complex (EC) within the plant circadian clock, in which all three components reach peak gene expression and protein levels at dusk. ELF3 serves as a scaffold to bind EARLY FLOWERING 4 (ELF4) and LUX ARRHYTHMO (LUX), two other components of the EC, and functions to control photoperiod sensitivity in plants. ELF3 also plays an important role in temperature and light input within plants for circadian clock entrainment. Additionally, it plays roles in light and temperature signaling that are independent from its role in the EC.

== Discovery ==
Along with ELF1 and ELF2, ELF3 was first identified by a research team consisting of Michelle T. Zagotta, S. Shannon, Carolyn I. Jacobs, and D. Ry Meeks‐Wagner. Their 1992 study published in Functional Plant Biology examined Arabidopsis thaliana mutants experiencing altered flowering. In Arabidopsis, the transition from vegetative to floral growth is initiated by floral signals in the shoot apex that regulate activity in the shoot meristem, and their study sought to identify the corresponding genetic components of this process by isolating early-flowering mutants. This procedure led the scientists to discover an early-flowering, photoperiod-insensitive Arabidopsis variant that was named elf3, as well as early-flowering, photoperiod-sensitive mutants named elf1 and elf2.

Members of the research team behind the discovery of ELF3 then published a 1996 paper in The Plant Journal that detailed further insights about the nature of ELF3. The authors found that the elf3 mutation on chromosome 2 was at a novel genetic locus. Furthermore, they found that elf3 mutants were less sensitive to light of all wavelengths, suggesting that that ELF3 regulated flowering through an alternate photoreceptive pathway.

== Structure ==
Arabidopsis thaliana ELF3
Gene
Number of Exons	4
Size	4.38 kb
Locus	AT2G25930
mRNA
Number of Introns	2747 bp
Protein
Molecular Weight	77.5 kDa
pI	8.68
Number of Amino Acids	695
Location in Arabidopsis
Chromosome	2
Coordinates	11058944 - 11063324 bp
Orientation	forward
Identifiers
Organism	Arabidopsis thaliana
Symbol	ELF3
Alt symbols	PYK20, Early flowering 3
Entrez	817134
RefSeq (mRNA)	NM_128153.3
RefSeq (Protein)	NP_180164.1
UniProt	O82804

In Arabidopsis thaliana, the ELF3 gene is located on the second chromosome and contains four exons and three introns. A cis-regulatory element known as the evening element (EE, AAAATATCT) is present in the promoters of the other evening complex genes, LUX and ELF4. The EE serves as a binding site for the morning clock factors CIRCADIAN CLOCK ASSOCIATED 1 (CCA1) and LATE ELONGATED HYPOCOTYL (LHY) to specifically inhibit the transcription of evening-expressed clock genes. The ELF3 promoter does not contain an EE; instead, it has an EE-like element (AATATCT) and two CCA1 binding sites, which allow CCA1 to repress ELF3 expression in the morning.

The ELF3 gene encodes a novel, nuclear-localized protein that is 695 amino acids in length. It contains an acidic region (residues 206–320) in its N-terminal, a proline-rich region (440–540) in the middle segment of the peptide sequence, and a glutamine/threonine-rich region (544–653) in its C-terminal. Despite these known characteristics, only one domain of known function has been identified for ELF3. A putative prion-like domain, which is found in intrinsically disordered regions of proteins, has been predicted at amino acid residues 430–609. This prion-like domain is required for protein phase separation of ELF3 and the formation of nuclear speckles. It also contains a glutamine-rich (polyQ) sequence that might be responsible for ELF3 temperature sensitivity. Aside from this prion-like domain, any other functional domains that the ELF3 protein might contain have yet to be identified. The proline-rich, acidic, and glutamate/threonine regions are characteristics that are frequently associated with transcriptional regulators, but ELF3 lacks a DNA-binding domain, making it unlikely that it binds and regulates DNA on its own. However, these characteristics are hypothesized to permit ELF3 to regulate transcription in concert with LUX and ELF4 as part of the EC.

ELF3 is known to be a hub of protein-protein interactions, and the regions of the ELF3 peptide responsible for these interactions have been identified for some of its binding partners. ELF3 uses its N-terminal region to associate with CONSTITUTIVE PHOTOMORPHOGENIC 1 (COP1) and GIGANTEA (GI) (residues 1–261) as well as with PHYTOCHROME B (PHYB) (residues 1–440). The middle region of ELF3 (residues 261–484) is required for interaction with ELF4, and the C-terminal region (residues 442–695) is required for ELF3 to bind to PHYTOCHROME INTERACTING FACTOR 4 (PIF4). The domain responsible for ELF3 interaction with LUX has not been tested.

== Function ==
=== Circadian oscillator ===
In living organisms, circadian oscillators are cyclic biochemical processes that produce daily rhythms. In Arabidopsis, ELF3, ELF4, and LUX comprise the evening complex, or EC, which regulates circadian rhythm in the growth and development of plants. The evening complex works in conjunction with the morning complex to form Arabidopsis' repressilator circadian oscillator. Throughout the day, CCA1 and LHY, morning complex transcription factors, regulate transcription of evening complex proteins by binding to the evening element regulatory areas, promoters of the evening complex genes. The evening complex, as a result, sees its activity peak at dusk, which is when ELF3, ELF4, and LUX see their expression peak.

At night, the EC is responsible for repressing TIMING OF CAB EXPRESSION 1 (TOC1), GI, and the mid-day genes PSEUDO-RESPONSE REGULATOR 7 and 9 (PRR7 and 9), among other genes. While TOC1 and the PRR proteins are repressed during the day by CCA1 and LHY, their expression peaks at dusk, repressing the morning complex proteins. The EC gradually inhibits TOC1 and the PRR proteins throughout the night, indirectly promoting CCA1 and LHY until they peak at dawn, promoting morning complex activity and inhibiting evening complex activity. The EC also represses LUX and ELF4, auto-regulating its own transcription.

Inhibition of GI at night causes reduced expression of the flowering-promoting genes CONSTANS (CO) and FLOWERING LOCUS T (FT). The evening complex is also responsible for repressing the transcription growth factors PHYTOCHROME INTERACTING FACTOR 4 (PIF4) and PIF5. Components of the EC, including ELF3 and LUX, interact with PIF4 and PIF5 to inhibit growth during nighttime.

Because ELF3 is essential for circadian rhythmicity, loss of ELF3 function in Arabidopsis renders the clock arrhythmic, as seen by observing outputs such as leaf movement and clock gene expression in constant conditions.

=== Regulation of hypocotyl elongation ===
ELF3 is a negative regulator of seedling stem length, known as hypocotyl elongation. The EC suppresses hypocotyl elongation by inhibiting the expression of growth-promoting factors PIF4 and PIF5 in the evening. At elevated temperatures, COP1-dependent degradation of ELF3 is enhanced, which allows the expression of genes like PIF4 and PIF5, promoting hypocotyl elongation in seedlings. Independent of the evening complex, ELF3 directly interacts with the PIF4 protein to prevent it from activating its downstream gene targets, which would lead to elongation growth if activated. ELF3 also inhibits hypocotyl elongation during shade avoidance response. Similar to its interaction with PIF4, under shaded conditions, ELF3 binds to and sequesters the transcriptional activator PIF7, preventing the activation of downstream, growth-promoting genes.

Mutations in ELF3 in Arabidopsis promote the growth of long hypocotyls. Defects persist in both red-light and blue-light conditions, although they are less severe when the plants are grown in constant white light. Studies have shown that ELF3 mutations have additive effects on hypocotyl elongation (in interaction with phyB mutations).

=== Temperature signal integration ===
The EC is responsible for integrating temperature inputs into the circadian clock by regulating the expression of both core clock genes, such as PRR7/9, LUX, and GI, and clock outputs, like the gene PIF4, which controls hypocotyl elongation. As part of the EC, association of ELF3 with the promoters of PRR9, LUX, and PIF4 is less stable at high temperatures, indicating that temperature inputs might directly control the recruitment of the evening complex to promoters. In Arabidopsis seedlings shifted to warmer temperatures (from 22 °C to 28 °C or from 16 °C to 22 °C), ELF3 was required to regulate the expression of GI, LUX, PIF4, PRR7, and PRR9.

=== Light signal transduction ===
The ELF3 protein is also a component of the PHYB signaling complex to control hypocotyl elongation. PHYB is a protein that mediates the plant's responses to continuous red light. However, ELF3 and PHYB act on independent signal transduction pathways to mediate plant flowering. It is suggested that ELF3 is able to regulate the photoperiodic induction of flowering by interacting with cryptochrome or other blue-light receptors such as ZEITLUPE (ZTL) and FLAVIN-BINDING, KELCH REPEAT, F-BOX1 (FKF1) in Arabidopsis thaliana.

=== Regulation of flowering time ===
In the long day facultative plant Arabidopsis, ELF3 is a key inhibitor of photoperiodic flowering when plants are grown in non-inductive environmental conditions. The EC represses the expression of GI, a positive regulator of flowering, in the early night by binding to the GI promoter and preventing its activation. Independent of the EC complex, ELF3 also regulates the accumulation of GI protein.

Mutations in ELF3 result in plants with a loss of photoperiod sensitivity and circadian regulation. Plants with elf3 mutations flower early in long day and short day conditions at the same developmental stage regardless of photoperiod. elf3 mutations also result in plants that are not as responsive to some light wavelengths, especially blue and green light. However, elf3 single mutants retain functional phytochrome-mediated pathways that regulate plant flowering.

=== Regulation of plant senescence ===
Mutations in ELF3 have also been associated with the speed of plant aging, or plant senescence, through the EC inhibition of PIF4 and PIF5. This prevents the process of leaf yellowing, an indicator of plant aging. In plants with ELF3 mutations, leaf yellowing occurred at a faster rate than wild type plants. However, ELF3's regulation pathway for senescence has not been fully established.

== Homologs ==
ELF3 homologs have been identified across the plant lineage in basal land plants, such as mosses, as well as across angiosperms, in both monocot and dicot species.

=== Angiosperm orthologs ===
Soybean (Glycine max) has two ELF3 orthologs in its genome. One of these two paralogs, GmELF3, has been implicated in regulating photoperiodic flowering. Recently, GmELF3 was identified as being responsible for the long-juvenile trait in some varieties of soybean, which permits its cultivation in the tropics and other low-latitude areas. Unlike in long-day facultative plants like Arabidopsis or barley, in short-day facultative plants (plants that reproduce in response to short days and long night) ELF3 appears to promote the transition from vegetative growth to reproductive growth. Mutations in GmELF3 delay flowering, allowing soybean plants to grow under the short days of low-latitude regions and still produce a reasonably sized harvest.

In rice (Oryza sativa), the ELF3 ortholog OsELF3 is required for robust circadian oscillation and is involved in the photoperiodic regulation of flowering.

Barley (Hordeum vulgare) has an ELF3 ortholog that is also necessary for circadian oscillation and regulates photoperiodic flowering, repressing the transition from vegetative to reproductive development under short days. In addition to an arrhythmic and early flowering phenotype, loss of elf3 function in barley causes plants grown under long-day conditions to reach reproductive maturity even faster in response to elevated temperatures (15 °C to 25 °C). Under short-days the same increase in temperature inhibited early/juvenile development. This suggested that the HvELF3 ortholog is also involved in temperature perception and temperature-mediated development. Specific varieties of barley with mutations in HvELF3 have been developed to tolerate the extremely short growing seasons and long days in high-latitude regions, such as in Scandinavia.

=== Other homologs ===
Multiple ELF3 homologs have been found in the genome of the model moss Physcomitrella patens, but it is currently unknown whether or not any of these PpELF3 paralogs have conserved function in circadian regulation or photoperiodic regulation of reproduction.

No homolog of ELF3 has been found in either Chlamydomonas reinhardtii or Ostreococcus tauri, two representative species of green algae, the organisms that are thought to be the evolutionary ancestors of land plants.
