= LUX =

Gene of the species Arabidopsis thaliana

LUX ARRHYTHMO

Identifiers
- Organism: Arabidopsis thaliana (thale cress)
- Symbol: LUX
- Alt. symbols: PCL1
- Entrez: 823817
- HomoloGene: 90991
- UniProt: Q9SNB4
Search for
- Structures: Swiss-model
- Domains: InterPro

LUX or Phytoclock1 (PCL1) is a gene that codes for LUX ARRHYTHMO, a protein necessary for circadian rhythms in Arabidopsis thaliana. LUX protein associates with Early Flowering 3 (ELF3) and Early Flowering 4 (ELF4) to form the Evening Complex (EC), a core component of the Arabidopsis repressilator model of the plant circadian clock. The LUX protein functions as a transcription factor that negatively regulates Pseudo-Response Regulator 9 (PRR9), a core gene of the Midday Complex, another component of the Arabidopsis repressilator model. LUX is also associated with circadian control of hypocotyl growth factor genes PHYTOCHROME INTERACTING FACTOR 4 (PIF4) and PHYTOCHROME INTERACTING FACTOR 5 (PIF5).

== Discovery ==
In 2000, the LUX gene was first sequenced in Arabidopsis thaliana by a team at the Plant Gene Expression Center at UC Berkeley as a part of the Arabidopsis Genome Initiative. In 2003, scientists from the Plant Gene Expression Center and the Genomic Analysis Laboratory at the Salk Institute for Biological Studies collaborated to identify expression of the LUX gene in Arabidopsis using cDNA arrays. In 2005, scientists at the Center for Gene Research at Nagoya University and the Steve Kay lab at the Scripps Research Institute studied null mutations of LUX and the other Evening Complex genes to show that LUX was necessary for circadian rhythms in A. thaliana.

== Structure ==
The LUX gene is located on the third chromosome of Arabidopsis thaliana and contains three exons. Upstream of the LUX gene is a promoter containing a cis-regulatory element known as the "evening element" (EE) with the sequence AAAATATCT. It is overrepresented in evening-expressed genes in the Arabidopsis repressilator. The EE may be bound by Circadian Clock Associated 1 (CCA1) and Late Elongated Hypocotyl (LHY) proteins to suppress expression of LUX. The LUX ARRHYTHMO protein has a length of 323 amino acids and contains a Myb-like GARP family transcription factor DNA-binding domain.

== Function ==
=== Circadian oscillator ===
The LUX ARRHYTHMO protein encoded by the LUX gene participates in the regulation of the Arabidopsis thaliana circadian clock. Along with ELF3 and ELF4, it is a member of the Evening Complex, a component of the Arabidopsis repressilator model of gene regulation. This three-protein complex is expressed and assembled during the evening to repress transcription of the PRR9 gene, which codes for a component of the Midday Complex. LUX likely represses PRR9 via direct binding to a DNA sequence that has not yet been elucidated. PRR9 protein subsequently represses CCA1 and LHY, genes which express components of the Morning Complex. Although LUX and ELF4 are induced by low intensity, non-damaging UV-B radiation, the direct molecular mechanism of light input into the Arabidopsis circadian clock has yet to be elucidated.

Additionally, as a part of the Arabidopsis thaliana repressilator, the LUX gene also represses its own transcription.

=== Arabidopsis thaliana growth and flowering ===
The EC binds to promoters of Phytochrome Interacting Factor 4 (PIF4) and Phytochrome Interacting Factor 5 (PIF5), repressing their expression and subsequently inhibiting plant growth in the evening. PIF4 and PIF5 proteins are both basic helix-loop-helix (bHLH) domain transcription factors that are implicated in the induction of Flowering Locus T (FT), which expresses a florigen involved in promoting A. thaliana flowering. Mutants lacking functional LUX are unable to repress PIF4 and PIF5, leading to early accumulation of PIF4 and PIF5 transcription factors and thus premature growth; consequently, LUX mutants often express an elongated hypocotyl phenotype due to excess growth during the night.

=== Temperature input ===
The EC also plays a role in the detection and response to temperature. Despite variations in temperature which would normally reduce the expression of GI (GIGANTEA), LUX, PIF4, PRR7, and PRR9, these genes showed constitutively high expression in LUX (as well as ELF3 and ELF4) mutants. This suggested that LUX mutants abolished the temperature-responsiveness of those clock genes. In addition, ELF3 association to LUX was found to be abolished at high temperatures, suggesting that temperature may play a role in recruiting EC components to their targeted promoters.

== Homologs ==
=== Paralogs ===
Paralogs of LUX have been found to act in conjunction with LUX in Arabidopsis circadian clock regulation pathways.

==== NOX/BOA ====
In the absence of LUX, ELF3 and ELF4 have also been found to form a complex with LUX paralog NOX (meaning “night” in Latin), also called BROTHER OF LUX ARRHYTHMO (BOA). NOX is a homologous Myb-like GARP transcription factor that binds to DNA sequences similar to LUX's binding, interacts directly with ELF4, and peaks in the late evening.

Experiments involving artificial microRNA (amiRNA) methods have shown that both NOX and LUX are required to recruit the EC to the PIF4 and PIF5 promoters. There is evidence for NOX having an important role in the regulation of the plant circadian oscillator; overexpression of NOX has been found to have circadian phenotypes of long periods, as well as altered expressions of CCA1, LHY, GI, and TOC1. In particular, overexpression of NOX showed increased amplitudes of CCA1 expression. NOX likely regulates CCA1 through direct binding to the CCA1 promoter, and, conversely, CCA1 protein has been found to bind to the NOX promoter and inhibit NOX expression.

In contrast to LUX, amiRNA knockouts of NOX have shown that NOX is not required for circadian rhythms, suggesting that the functionality of LUX and NOX are not completely redundant. RNAi experiments reducing NOX expression showed a continuation of circadian rhythms, whereas LUX null mutants are arrhythmic. Currently, more research must be done to determine how LUX and NOX differ in their contributions to the EC.

=== Orthologs ===
Specific studies of LUX (and ELF3) orthologous mutant alleles have identified variants in flowering and photoperiod-dependent growth.

==== STERILE NODES ====
An ortholog for LUX named STERILE NODES (SN) was discovered in Pisum sativum. The name STERILE NODES came from the observation that photoperiod-responsive P. sativum lines formed more vegetative nodes before flowering compared to less photoperiod-responsive lines. The relationship of LUX and SN as orthologs was concluded based on the discovery of functionally and phenotypically similar mutations in SN and LUX, as well as apparent causal linkages between specific polymorphisms and SN mutant phenotypes. Like LUX, SN was found to be a major gene locus that controls regulation of circadian clock function and photoperiod-sensitive flowering. Also similar to LUX, SN protein is expressed rhythmically when exposed to light-dark cycles.

Gene loci orthologous to Arabidopsis ELF3, ELF4, and GI have also been found in P. sativum, named HIGH RESPONSE TO PHOTOPERIOD (HR), DIE NEUTRALIS (DNE), and LATE BLOOMER1 (LATE1) respectively. However, they have not yet been discovered to form a functional complex equivalent to the EC in Arabidopsis.

==== HvLUX1 ====
HvLUX1 in Hordeum vulgare has been identified as an ortholog of LUX. The experiment leading to the discovery of HvLUX1 involved a mutation in the early maturity 10 (eam10) locus in the H. vulgare genome. The mutation, called Bowman(eam10), abolished the circadian rhythm observed in H. vulgare flowering. Via high throughput sequencing, HvLUX1 has been identified as a candidate gene for this locus, though its specific mechanism of action in the circadian clock has yet to be demonstrated.

Gene loci homologous to A. thaliana PRR genes (PRR7 and PRR9), ELF3 and FT have also been found in H. vulgare, named PHOTOPERIOD 1 (Ppd-H1), HvELF3, and HvFT1, respectively.

==== ROC15 and ROC75 ====
Orthologs have been found for all three members of the Arabidopsis thaliana Evening Complex, but it is currently unknown if the EC is formed in species other than A. thaliana. Two orthologs of LUX, ROC15 and ROC75, have been discovered in Chlamydomonas reinhardtii, but orthologs of ELF3 and ELF4 in C. reinhardtii have not yet been found.

== See also ==
- Circadian Clock Associated 1
- TOC1 (gene)
- Pseudo-response regulator
- Dmitri Nusinow
- Oscillating gene
- Chronobiology
