= Rev-Erb =

Type of protein

nuclear receptor subfamily 1, group D, member 1

Identifiers
- Symbol: NR1D1
- Alt. symbols: ear-1, hRev, Rev-ErbAalpha, THRA1
- NCBI gene: 9572
- HGNC: 7962
- OMIM: 602408
- RefSeq: NM_021724
- UniProt: P20393

Other data
- Locus: Chr. 17 q11.2
Search for
- Structures: Swiss-model
- Domains: InterPro

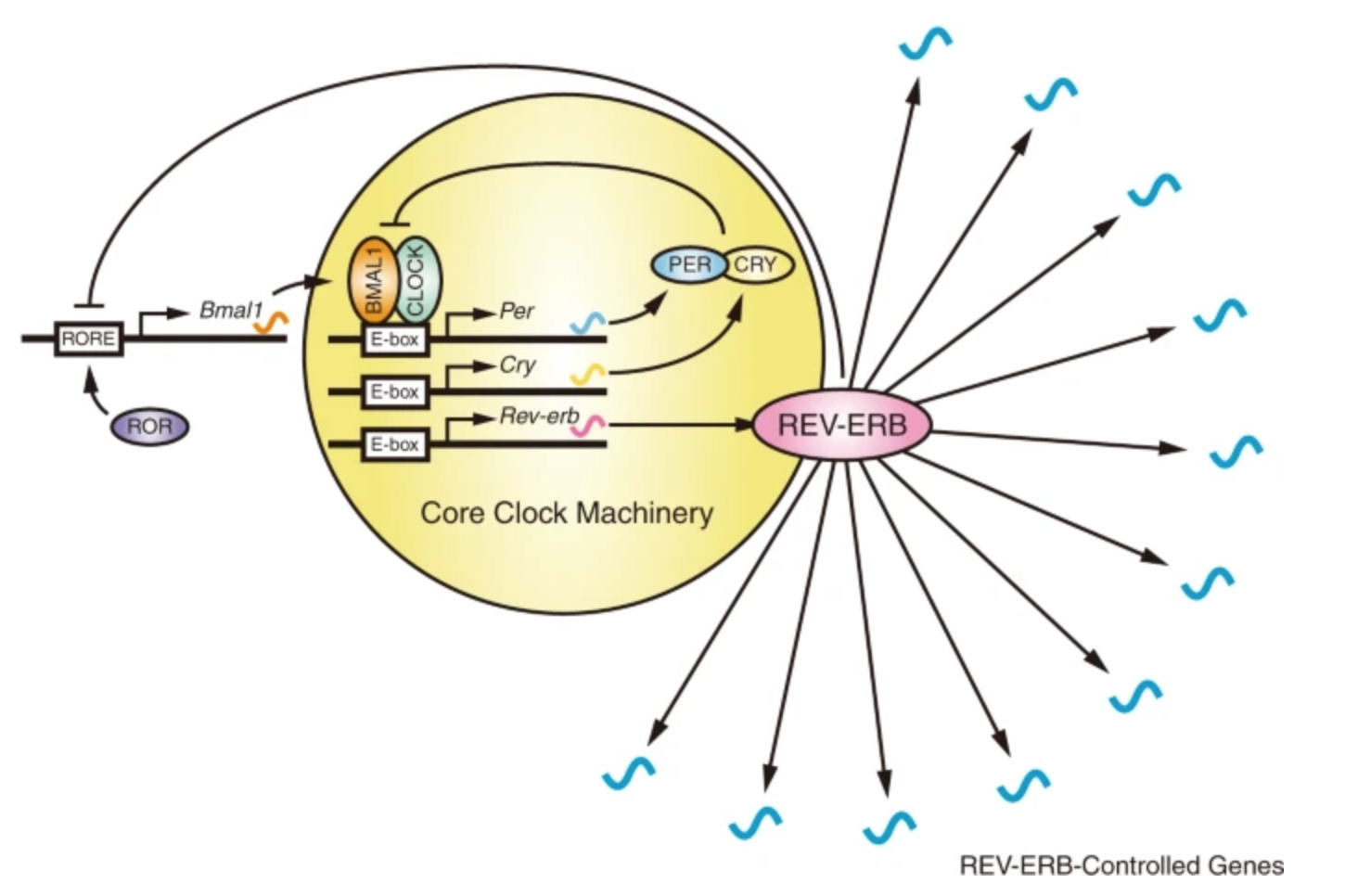
Diagram showing how REV-ERB regulates circadian gene expression through the secondary loop of the circadian transcription/translation feedback loop (TTFL)

nuclear receptor subfamily 1, group D, member 2

Identifiers
- Symbol: NR1D2
- Alt. symbols: BD73, RVR, EAR-1r, HZF2, Hs.37288
- NCBI gene: 9975
- HGNC: 7963
- OMIM: 602304
- RefSeq: XM_001130839
- UniProt: Q14995

Other data
- Locus: Chr. 3 p24.1
Search for
- Structures: Swiss-model
- Domains: InterPro

The Rev-Erb proteins are members of the nuclear receptor (NR) superfamily of intracellular transcription factors and key regulatory components of the circadian clock. There are two forms of the receptor, Rev-Erb alpha and Rev-Erb beta, which are each encoded by a separate gene (NR1D1 and NR1D2, respectively).

These proteins act as key regulators of clock gene expression through transcriptional repression of Bmal1. Through their regulation of clock-controlled genes, the Rev-Erb proteins affect several physiological processes throughout the body, including metabolic, endocrine, and immune pathways.

== Nomenclature ==
In the NRNC classification scheme, Rev-Erb is nuclear receptor subfamily 1 group D (NR1D). The name "Rev-Erb" derived by truncation from "Rev-ERBA" (Rev-Erbα), which in turn was named because it was on the opposite strand of ERBA (THRA) oncogene. The paralogous Rev-Erbβ does not seem to have anything special on its reverse strand. Older sources may use "Rev-ERBA" as the family name.

== Function ==
REV-ERV alpha and REV-ERB beta function as powerful transcriptional repressors, crucial for linking the body's internal circadian clock (daily rhythms) with metabolism, immunity, and other physiological processes by controlling gene expression. They act particularly in tissues like the liver, heart, and immune cells, influencing rhythms in glucose, lipids, inflammation, and energy use, often by recruiting corepressors to shut down gene activity.

REV-ERV alpha and REV-ERB beta also have a key role in immune cells and inflammatory response. They link the circadian clock to immunity by modulating inflammatory signaling (e.g., via TLR4, NLRP3), neuroinflammation, and autoimmune-related TH17 pathways.

== Clinical significance ==
The master regulation function of REV-ERB proteins make them potential therapeutic targets in preclinical studies for a range of conditions, primarily metabolic disorders, inflammatory diseases, and cancer. Modulating REV-ERB activity, mostly through synthetic agonists that enhance their suppressive function (e.g., SR9009, SR9011, GSK4112) and some antagonists (e.g., SR8278), has shown therapeutic potential in various disease models. For example, REV-ERBs regulate lipid and bile acid metabolism in the liver. Agonists can help reduce hepatic steatosis (fatty liver disease) and fibrosis. REV-ERBα can also be targeted to alleviate glycemia disorders and diabetes. The receptors are potential drug targets for non-alcoholic steatohepatitis.

== See also ==
- Rev-Erbɑ
- Rev-Erbβ
- Nuclear Receptors
- Transcription Factors
- Circadian Clock
