= Nidufexor =

Chemical compound

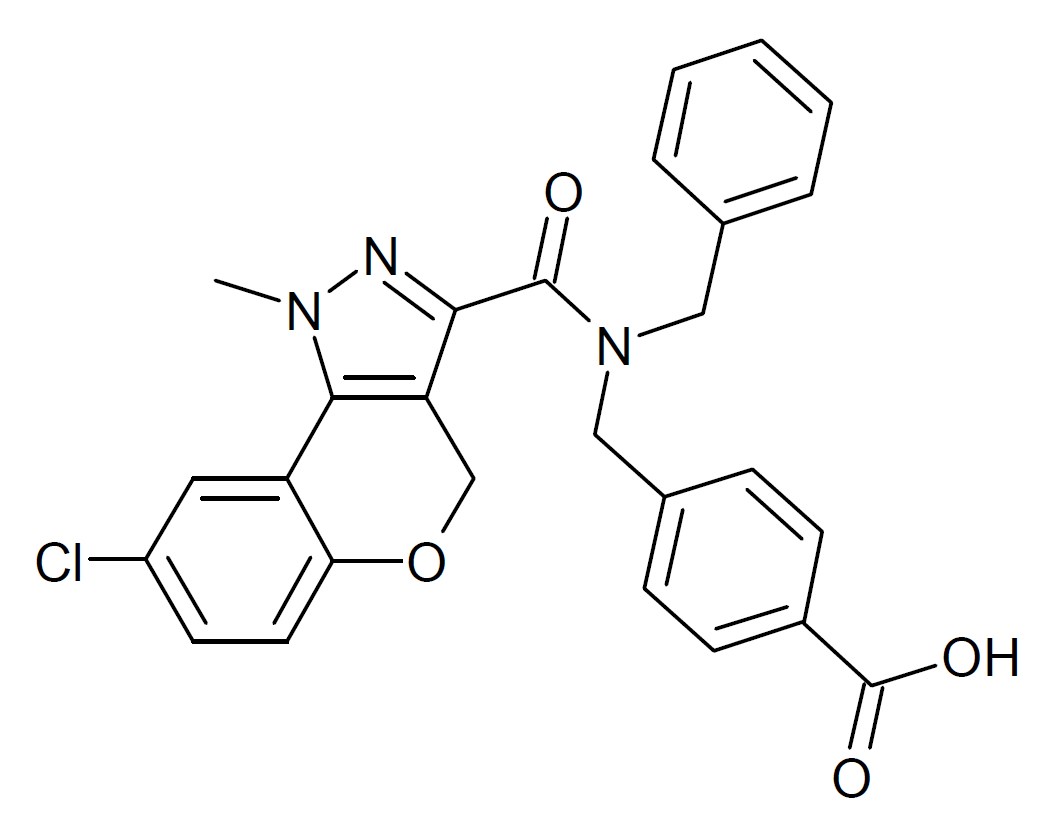

Identifiers
- IUPAC name: 4-{[benzyl-(8-chloro-1-methyl-4H-chromeno[4,3-c]pyrazole-3-carbonyl)amino]methyl}benzoic acid
- CAS Number: 1773489-72-7
- PubChem CID: 118063735
- ChemSpider: 57617776
- UNII: CJ1PL0TE6J
- ChEMBL: ChEMBL4297626
- CompTox Dashboard (EPA): DTXSID801336678

Chemical and physical data
- Formula: C_{27}H_{22}ClN_{3}O_{4}
- Molar mass: 487.94 g·mol^{−1}
- 3D model (JSmol): Interactive image
- SMILES: CN1C2=C(COC3=C2C=C(C=C3)Cl)C(=N1)C(=O)N(CC4=CC=CC=C4)CC5=CC=C(C=C5)C(=O)O
- InChI: InChI=1S/C27H22ClN3O4/c1-30-25-21-13-20(28)11-12-23(21)35-16-22(25)24(29-30)26(32)31(14-17-5-3-2-4-6-17)15-18-7-9-19(10-8-18)27(33)34/h2-13H,14-16H2,1H3,(H,33,34); Key:JYTIXGYXBIBOMN-UHFFFAOYSA-N

Nidufexor (LMB-763) is a drug which acts as a partial agonist of the farnesoid X receptor (FXR). It has reached Phase II clinical trials for the treatment of diabetic nephropathy and nonalcoholic steatohepatitis.

== See also ==
- GSK-4112
- SR9009
- SR9011
