= DBP =

DBP may refer to:

== Medicine ==
- DBP (gene), a gene coding for the D site of albumin promoter (albumin D-box) binding protein
- Deathbed phenomena
- Diastolic blood pressure, minimum blood pressure between two heartbeats
- Vitamin D-binding protein

== Science and technology ==
- Dibutyl phthalate, a plasticizer
- Digital back-propagation, a technique for compensating all fiber impairments in optical transmission systems
- Disinfection by-product, a chemical occurring in water as a result of disinfection

== Other ==
- Dave Benson Phillips, a British children's TV presenter
- Democratic Regions Party, (Turkish: Demokratik Bölgeler Partisi), a political party in Turkey
- German Farmers' Party (German: Deutsche Bauernpartei), a former German political party (1928–1933)
- Deutsche Bundespost, former German federal post office
- Development Bank of the Philippines
- Dewan Bahasa dan Pustaka, a government body responsible for coordinating the use of the Malay language in Malaysia
- Language and Literature Bureau (Malay: Dewan Bahasa dan Pustaka), the official Malay-language regulator and public libraries operator in Brunei
- Don Bosco Prep, all-boys Roman Catholic school in Ramsey, New Jersey
