= David Souter (disambiguation) =

David Souter (1939–2025) was an American jurist who served as an associate justice of the United States Supreme Court from 1990 to 2009.

David Souter or Dave Souter may also refer to:

- Dave Souter (1940–2020), Scottish footballer
- David Henry Souter (1862–1935), Australian artist

== See also ==
- Dave Soutar (born 1940), ten-pin bowler
- David Suter (artist), (born 1949), American artist
- David Suter (biologist), (born 1978), Swiss biologist
