= David Suter =

David Suter may refer to:

- David Suter (artist) (born 1949), American artist
- David Suter (biologist) (born 1978), Swiss biologist
