= Jerelle Kraus =

American art director, artist, and writer

Jerelle Kraus is an American art director, artist, and writer.

== Early life ==
Kraus was born in Southern California to Joyce Kraus and Dr. Otto Kraus. Ms. Kraus taught at the Edison School, Berkeley, and Mr. Kraus was an emeritus professor of philosophy at University of California Los Angeles. Jerelle attended Pomona College, was a sophomore exchange student at Swarthmore College, received a certificate from École nationale supérieure des Beaux-Arts in Paris, a BA and an MA in art from the University of California, Berkeley, and was a Fulbright scholar in Munich.

== Career ==
=== Art direction ===
While living in San Francisco, Kraus was the art director of Ramparts Magazine and the founding creative director of Francis Ford Coppola's City Magazine.

In 1977, Kraus began her tenure at The New York Times. She was the first art director of the Living section. She began at the op-ed section in 1979. At Op-Ed, Kraus commissioned many illustrations from well-known artists, including Ralph Steadman, Roland Topor, Maurice Sendak. Kraus spent 30 years at The New York Times, 13 of them at op-ed.

=== Freelance writing ===
In addition to her work as an art director, Kraus has been published as a freelance writer. In 1978, she published Museum Mammoth Is a Metamporph on the cover of the New York Times Metropolitan section. The article, "," featured Gerry Lynas, a New York sculptor, building two large-scale ice sculptures—one of a Wooly Mammoth and one of a Stegosaurus—in front of the American Museum of Natural History.

In 1998, Kraus published several pieces about the death of Roland Topor, graphic artist, novelist, and Kraus' friend. The Endpaper of the New York Times Magazine published, "," a tribute to Topor following his death. Her short piece, "Many Muses," was published in The New Yorker commissioned by Tina Brown.

In 2001, she wrote an article entitled "Charmed by Morocco in a Wink," that appeared in the travel section of the New York Times.

In 2003, she subbed for William Safire's New York Times column, "On Language." The piece, headlined, "Fancifying," is about Americans' desire to use highbrow language and how this often results in incorrect usage.

In 2011, Kraus published two book reviews in USA Today. The first was a review of Laurence Bergreen's book Columbus: the Four Voyages. The second, a review of Tolstoy: A Russian Life by Rosamund Bartlett, was published as one of four reviews of biographies of major novelists.

Kraus' book All the Art That's Fit to Print (And Some that Wasn't): Inside the New York Times Op-Ed Page was published by Columbia University Press in 2009. It tells the history of Op-Ed, the revolutionary phenomenon that began at The New York Times in 1970. Though it focuses on the art of Op-Ed, it remains the only book about Op-Ed. In addition to being a large format coffee-table book, it is used as a text book for journalism and illustration courses at the university level.

The book has received many reviewers' acclaim including The Washington Post, Bill Maher, San Francisco Chronicle, Ralph Steadman, Slate, History Wire, Publishers Weekly, Fairness & Accuracy in Reporting, and NBC.com.

== Current life ==
Kraus lives in New York City where she works as a freelance writer and teaches as an adjunct professor at Fordham University. She is the ex-wife of Argentine artist, Horacio Cardo, who died on October 22, 2018, of complications caused by a stroke.
