= SR9011 =

Chemical compound

Identifiers
- IUPAC name: 3-(((4-chlorobenzyl)((5-nitrothiophen-2-yl)methyl)amino)methyl)-N-pentylpyrrolidine-1-carboxamide
- CAS Number: 1379686-29-9
- PubChem CID: 57394021
- ChemSpider: 28487552
- UNII: VYI79FLZ6W
- ChEMBL: ChEMBL1961797
- CompTox Dashboard (EPA): DTXSID601045516

Chemical and physical data
- Formula: C_{23}H_{31}ClN_{4}O_{3}S
- Molar mass: 479.04 g·mol^{−1}
- 3D model (JSmol): Interactive image
- SMILES: CCCCCNC(=O)N1CCC(CN(Cc2ccc(Cl)cc2)Cc3ccc(s3)[N+](=O)[O-])C1
- InChI: InChI=1S/C23H31ClN4O3S/c1-2-3-4-12-25-23(29)27-13-11-19(16-27)15-26(14-18-5-7-20(24)8-6-18)17-21-9-10-22(32-21)28(30)31/h5-10,19H,2-4,11-17H2,1H3,(H,25,29); Key:PPUYOYQTTWJTIU-UHFFFAOYSA-N

SR9011 is a research drug that was developed by Professor Thomas Burris of Scripps as an agonist of Rev-ErbAα with a half-maximum inhibitory concentration (IC_{50}) = 790 nM for Rev-Erbα and IC_{50} = 560 nM for Rev-ErbAβ. It has been used in the study of the regulation of the circadian rhythm and its links to immune system function, inflammation and cancer.

== See also ==
- GSK-4112
- GW501516
- Nidufexor
- SR8278
- SR9009
