= SR9009 =

Chemica compound, Agonist of Rev-ErbA

Identifiers
- IUPAC name: ethyl-3-(((4-chlorobenzyl)((5-nitrothiophen-2-yl)methyl)amino)methyl)pyrrolidine-1-carboxylate
- CAS Number: 1379686-30-2
- PubChem CID: 57394020
- ChemSpider: 28487410
- UNII: X5DCA09N30
- ChEMBL: ChEMBL1961796
- CompTox Dashboard (EPA): DTXSID901045515

Chemical and physical data
- Formula: C_{20}H_{24}ClN_{3}O_{4}S
- Molar mass: 437.94 g·mol^{−1}
- 3D model (JSmol): Interactive image
- SMILES: CCOC(=O)N1CCC(C1)CN(CC2=CC=C(C=C2)Cl)CC3=CC=C(S3)[N+](=O)[O-]
- InChI: InChI=1S/C20H24ClN3O4S/c1-2-28-20(25)23-10-9-16(13-23)12-22(11-15-3-5-17 (21)6-4-15)14-18-7-8-19(29-18)24(26)27/h3-8,16H,2,9-14H2,1H3; Key:MMJJNHOIVCGAAP-UHFFFAOYSA-N

SR9009, also known as Stenabolic, is a research drug that was developed by professor Thomas Burris of the Scripps Research Institute as an agonist of Rev-ErbA (i.e., increases the constitutive repression of genes regulated by Rev-ErbA) with a half-maximum inhibitory concentration (IC_{50}) = 670 nM for Rev-ErbAα and IC_{50} = 800 nM for Rev-ErbAβ. In an animal study, some of its effects were found to be independent of REV-ERB with an unknown mechanism of action.

Activation of Rev-ErbA-α by SR9009 in mice increases exercise capacity by increasing mitochondria counts in skeletal muscle.

Abuse of SR9009 has been reported within the bodybuilding community, resulting in SR9009 being placed on the World Anti-Doping Agency list of prohibited drugs. SR9009 and the related SR9011 drug are described as "Hormone and Metabolic Modulators".

== See also ==
- GSK4112
- GW501516
- SR8278
- SR9011
