= Ueli Schibler =

Swiss chronobiologist

- Born: June 16, 1947 (age 79); Olten, Switzerland
- Citizenship: Swiss Citizen
- Education: University of Bern
- Awards: Aschoff Honma Prize of the Honma Foundation, Louis-Jeantet Prize for Medicine (2000)
- Scientific career
- Fields: Molecular biology, Chronobiology

Notes
- Hobby: herpetology

Ueli Schibler (born June 16, 1947) is a Swiss biologist, chronobiologist and a professor at the University of Geneva. His research has contributed significantly to the field of chronobiology and the understanding of circadian clocks in the body. Several of his studies have demonstrated strong evidence for the existence of robust, self-sustaining circadian clocks in the peripheral tissues.

Schibler has studied the molecular biology of gene expressions and chronobiology since his serendipitous discovery of a protein expressed in a strong circadian fashion. He is also a current editor for several academic journals, such as PLoS Biology, EMBOReports and Journal of Biological Rhythms.

== Biography ==
=== Early life and family ===
Ueli Schibler was born in 1947 in Olten, a small town in Switzerland. His father was a sculptor who manufactured monuments, and his mother helped manage the family business. In 1972, Ueli Schibler married with Monika Schibler, who he met at the age of 19, and had a son and daughter. His son was born in Philadelphia in 1977 when Ueli was a postdoc at Fox Chase Cancer Center while his daughter was born in 1979, one year after they moved back to Switzerland. Currently, Ueli Schibler resides in Switzerland and works in University of Geneva as a professor at the Department of Molecular Biology. Monika and Ueli Schibler are now grandparents and have three grandchildren.

=== Education and academic experiences ===
Over 5 years from 1967 to 1972, Schibler pursued the study of biology, biochemistry, and chemistry at the University of Bern, approximately seventy kilometers from his hometown of Olten. At graduation, he was awarded a Diploma in Biology. Afterwards, he continued his education there, eventually receiving his PhD diploma with Latin Honors in 1975 for his work on ribosomal RNA in the context of vertebrate evolution. He then obtained a postdoctoral fellowship from the Swiss National Science Foundation and worked at the laboratory of Robert Perry, who was based at the Fox Chase Cancer Center in Philadelphia for two years. In 1978, he became a junior group leader at The Swiss Institute for Experimental Cancer Research. In 1981, he was promoted to the status of a group leader with tenure, where he remained for three years. Finally, in 1984, he obtained a full professorship at the Department of Molecular Biology at the University of Geneva, where he currently resides.

=== Serendipitous discovery ===
Schibler was thrust into the world of chronobiology on a single chance discovery. While examining transcription of serum albumin gene in the liver, they discovered a DNA Binding Protein (DBP) for the albumin promoter that happened to be rhythmic in its expression. While they initially thought that the underlying mechanism was the rhythmic secretion of hormones, it became clear that the rhythmic expression of DBP was driven instead by cell-autonomous oscillators that are entrained by the master clock in the Suprachiasmatic Nucleus (SCN). Schibler and his colleagues followed this line of inquiry into the field of chronobiology.

=== Current research ===
A timing system with circadian clocks is closely related to all behaviors in mammals. Schibler is currently doing researches on how biological clock works. Schibler together with his research team in University of Geneva have developed a technique called "Synthetic Tandem Repeat PROMoter (STAR-PROM) screening" which can assist identify transcription factors and their functions in peripheral cells so that to figure out how circadian gene expression is governed rhythmically with regulatory mechanisms in cultured cells.

== Scientific achievements ==
=== Evidence of circadian clocks in peripheral tissues ===
While at the Department of Molecular Biology at the University of Geneva, Schibler's research team unexpectedly came across DBP, a transcriptional regulatory protein whose expression was found to be robustly circadian in the liver. This discovery prompted Schibler and his team to further investigate the role of circadian clocks in peripheral tissue.

In a 1998 study, Schibler and his team published a paper providing strong evidence for the existence of circadian clocks in mammalian peripheral tissue. The study demonstrated that "immortalized rat fibroblasts", frozen in cell culture for 25 years, were still capable of expressing strong circadian rhythms. After an initial serum-shock, both rat-1 fibroblasts and H35 hepatoma cells demonstrated cyclic mRNA expression of clock genes rper1 and rper2, and Rev-Erbα, and the clock controlled genes Tef and Dbp, with a period of nearly 24 hours and a phase relationship closely mimicking those observed in rat liver cells in vivo.

==== Circadian rhythms in peripheral tissue persist during cell division ====
In a 2004 study that provided further evidence for the existence of self-sustained, autonomous oscillators in the peripheral tissue, Schibler and his colleagues found evidence for interaction between the circadian clock and the timing of cell division. Single-cell recordings revealed how circadian gene expression in fibroblasts persists during cell division, and how cell division can phase shift the circadian cycle of the dividing cells. Due to the central role of Period (PER) and Cryptochrome (CRY) proteins in the negative feedback loop of the circadian clock, Schibler and colleagues posited the PER-CRY complex concentration to be the likely determinant of the phase of the clock. When cell division frequency was plotted against circadian time, this yielded a highly nonrandom distribution, suggesting a gating mechanism of mitosis by the circadian clock

=== Feeding Rhythms are Strong Zeitgebers for Peripheral Clocks ===
Schibler and his colleagues have also studied mechanisms by which peripheral oscillators are synchronized within the body. In 2000, they conducted experiments on the effects of restricted feeding time on mice and observed that the phase of peripheral oscillators – but not that of the SCN – gradually adapted to imposed feeding-fasting rhythms within a week or two. These results showed that feeding time functions as a potent Zeitgeber for peripheral cells, but not for the SCN. Schibler and colleagues posited that the SCN can synchronize peripheral clocks simply by imposing rest-activity cycles, which in turn drive feeding-fasting cycles. However, in the meantime they discovered additional pathways involved in the phase-resetting of peripheral clocks, such as signaling by glucocorticoid hormones, body temperature, and actin dynamics.

=== REV-ERBα is a Major Regulator of the Circadian Clock ===
In 2002, Schibler and his colleagues identified the nuclear orphan receptor REV-ERBα as the major regulator of expression of the circadian gene Bmal1 in both the SCN and peripheral tissues. BMAL-1, as a heterodimer with CLOCK activates the transcription of the components of the negative limb encoding PER and CRY repressor proteins. Together, the feedback loop of the positive limb and its effects on the negative limb produce the mammalian circadian rhythms in clock gene expression. REV-ERBα and its paralog REV-ERBβ are the molecular links between these two feedback loops.

== Research experience ==
- Professor, University of Geneva (Since 1984)
- ”chercheur établi“, the Swiss Institute for Experimental Cancer Research in Epalinges (ISREC), Switzerland (1981–1984)
- ”chercheur associé“, the Swiss Institute for Experimental Cancer Research in Epalinges (ISREC), Switzerland (1978–1981)
- Visiting scientist, Dr R.P. Perry's laboratory (1977–1978)
- Postdoctoral fellow, Dr R.P. Perry's laboratory, Institute for Cancer Research, Fox Chase Center, Philadelphia (1975–1976)

== Plenary and honorary lectures since 2007 ==
- 2007:
1. Werner Heisenberg Lecture, Bavarian Academy of Sciences and C. F. von Siemens Foundation, Munich, Germany
2. EMBO Lecture, 15th P450 Conference, Bled, Slovenia
3. Plenary Lecture, 9th European Congress of Endocrinology, Budapest, Hungary
4. Plenary Lecture, IPSEN Meeting: The Evolving Biology of Growth and Metabolism, Lisbon, Portugal
- 2008: Pittendrigh Aschoff Lecture, 8th Meeting of the Society for Research on Biological Rhythms, Sandestin, USA
- 2009: Life Science Colloquium, Weizmann Institute, Rehovot, Israel
- 2010:
1. Mendel Lecture, Augustinian Abbey in Brno, Czech Republic
2. University Lecture, UT Southwestern Medical Center, Dallas, USA
- 2011:
1. Keynote Address, EMBO Conference on Nuclear Receptors, Sitges, Spain
2. Plenary Lecture, 10th Annual World Congress of the Human Proteome Organization, Geneva, Switzerland
3. Plenary Lecture, XII Congress of the European Biological Rhythms Society, Oxford, UK
4. Karl-Friedrich Bonhoeffer Lecture, Max Planck Institute for Biophysical Chemistry, Germany
- 2012:
1. Kjeldgaard International Lecture in Molecular Biology, Aarhus University, Denmark
2. Plenary Lecture, 14ème Réunion Commune des Sociétés Francophones de Néphrologie et de Dialyse, Geneva
3. Plenary Lecture, 4th Congress European Academy of Paediatric Societies (EAPS), Istanbul, Turkey
4. Plenary Lecture, SGED-SSED Annual Meeting, Berne
5. Aschoff-Honma Prize Lecture, Sapporo, Japan
- 2013:
1. Plenary Lecture, International Congress of Comparative Endocrinology, Barcelona, Spain
2. Plenary Lecture, XIII Congress of the European Biological Rhythms Society, Munich, Germany
- 2014:
1. Elected Richard M. Furlaud Distinguished Lecturer of 2013, Rockefeller University, New York, USA (Lecture held on February 14, 2014)
2. "Servier Honorary Lecture" at the Open Ceremony of the World Congress of Osteoporosis, Osteoarthritis and Musculoskeletal Diseases, Seville, Spain

== Notable papers ==
- Balsalobre, A.; Damiola, F.; Schibler, U. (1998). "A serum shock induces circadian gene expression in mammalian tissue culture cells". Cell. 93 (6): 929–937. doi:10.1016/S0092-8674(00)81199-X. PMID 9635423.
- McGinnis, W.; Levine, M. S.; Hafen, E.; Kuroiwa, A.; Gehring, W. J. (1984). "A conserved DNA sequence in homoeotic genes of the Drosophila Antennapedia and bithorax complexes". Nature. 308 (5958): 428–33. Bibcode:1984Natur.308..428M. doi:10.1038/308428a0. PMID 6323992. (the homeobox paper)
- Han, Kyuhyung; Levine, Michael S.; Manley, James L. (1989). "Synergistic activation and repression of transcription by Drosophila homeobox proteins". Cell. 56 (4): 573–83. doi:10.1016/0092-8674(89)90580-1. PMID 2563673.
- Small, S; Blair, A; Levine, M (1992). "Regulation of even-skipped stripe 2 in the Drosophila embryo". The EMBO Journal. 11 (11): 4047–57. doi:10.1002/j.1460-2075.1992.tb05498.x. PMC 556915. PMID 1327756.
- Arora, K; Levine, M S; O'Connor, M B (1994). "The screw gene encodes a ubiquitously expressed member of the TGF-beta family required for specification of dorsal cell fates in the Drosophila embryo". Genes & Development. 8 (21): 2588–601. doi:10.1101/gad.8.21.2588. PMID 7958918.
- Gachon, Frederic; Fonjallaz, Philippe; Damiola, Francesca; Gos, Pascal; Kodama, Tohru; Zakany, Joszef; Duboule, Denis; Petit, Brice; Tafti, Mehdi; Schibler, Ueli (2004). "The loss of circadian PAR bZip transcription factors results in epilepsy". Genes & Development. 18 (12): 1397–1412. doi:10.1101/gad.301404. PMC 423191. PMID 423191.

== See also ==
- Chronobiology
- University of Geneva
- Circadian rhythm
- suprachiasmatic nucleus
- Rev-ErbA alpha
- PER
- CRY
- BMAL1
- alpha-amylase
- CRE
