= Horacio Cardo =

Argentine painter and illustrator (1944–2018)

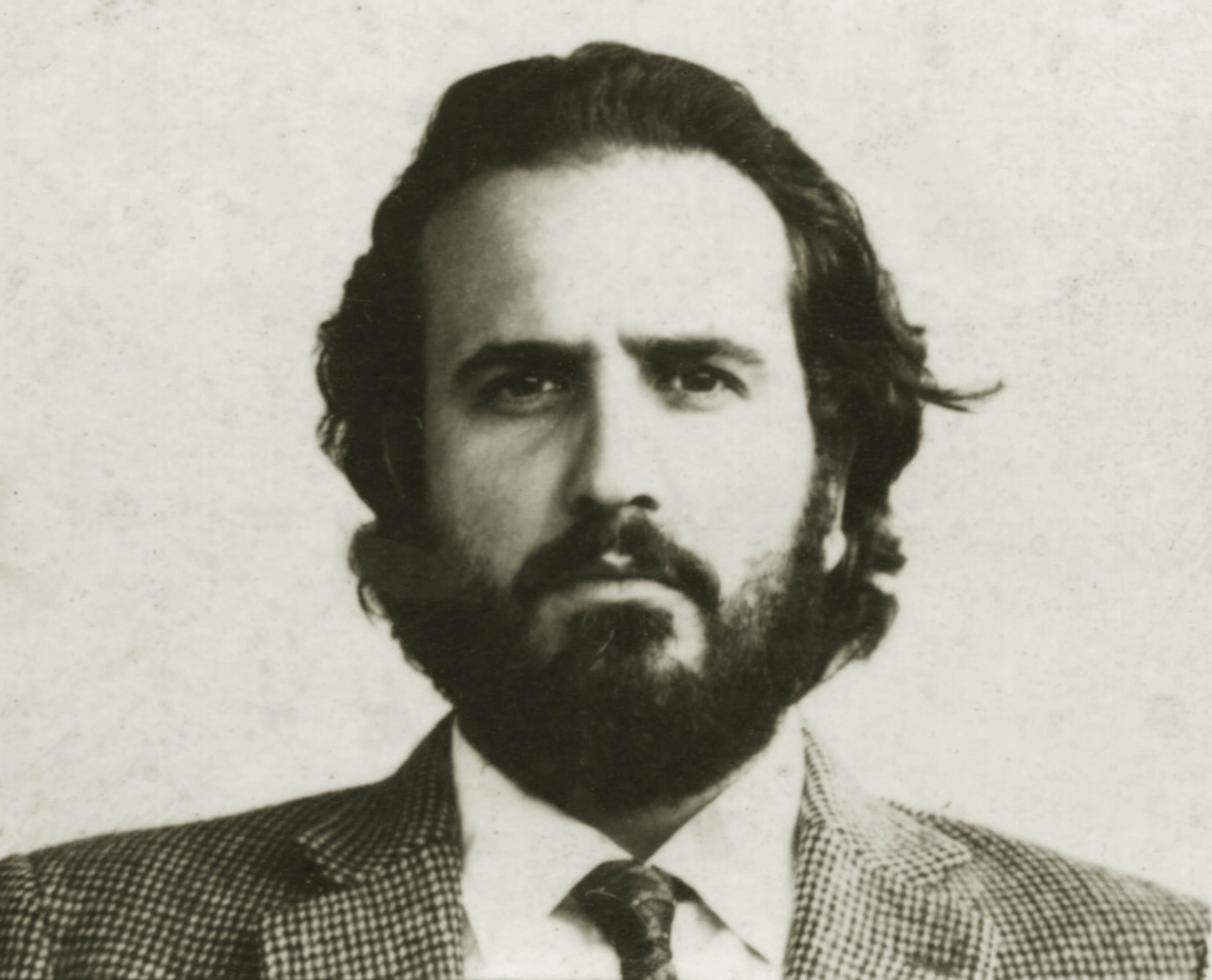
Cardo at the age of 30

Horacio Fidel Cardo (May 20, 1944 – October 22, 2018) was a painter and illustrator from Argentina.

== Biography ==
Cardo was born in Temperley, Buenos Aires Province. He began his career at a very early age, publishing his work in numerous national and international media. He not only created paintings and three-dimensional works, but also focused on humour, drawing, and book illustration.

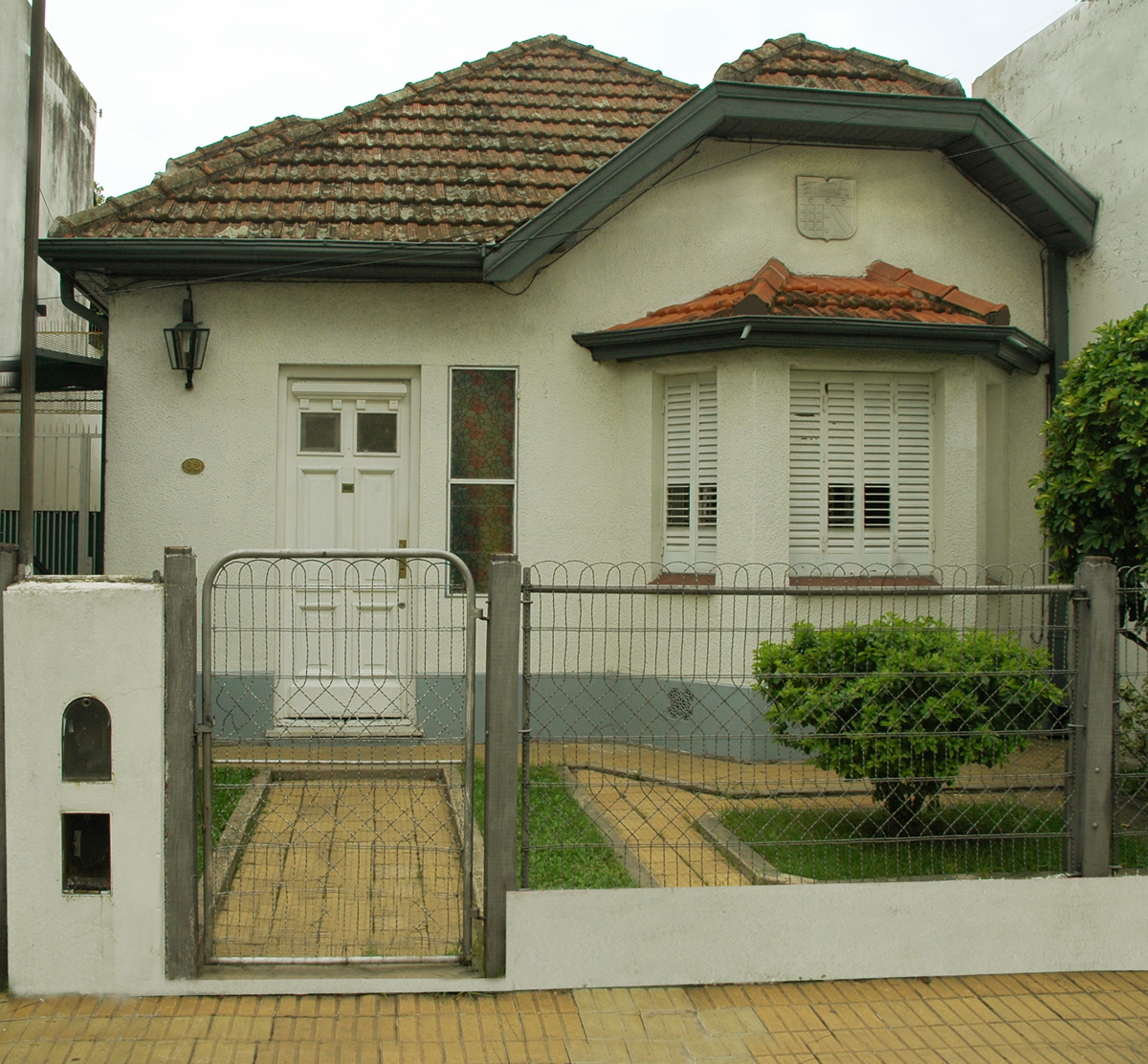
62 Alberdi St. Temperley, the house where Horacio Cardo was born

His art was influenced by artists as diverse as Amedeo Modigliani, Chaïm Soutine, André François, Ronald Searle, Jean Dubuffet, Antonio Saura (whose Retrato Imaginario de Briggite Bardot, exhibited in the Di Tella Institute, impressed him not only because of its quality, but mainly because at that time, coincidentally, he was also working along that line), among others.

Aside from his collaborations in many popular and cultural Argentinian magazines, his first illustrated book, El Compadrito by Jorge Luis Borges and Silvina Bullrich, was published by the Compañía General Fabril Editora. At this time, he was twenty-two years old. Soon, he was to illustrate other books, with this and other publishing houses.

From 1983 to 2007, he worked regularly as a freelancer in The New York Times. From 1994 onward, he worked as freelancer with the International Herald Tribune (the global edition of The New York Times), which is based in Paris and aimed at European and Asian markets.

Based in the United States, he worked with the most prominent magazines and newspapers in the country: The Washington Post, Los Angeles Times, The Wall Street Journal, Chicago Tribune, Time, Business Week, Playboy, Bloomberg, Le Monde, The Nation, and many others. He also illustrated posters for movies and Broadway plays. His countless book covers for books about great thinkers and politicians, published by Editorial Planeta in Barcelona and the newspaper El Mundo in Madrid, achieved great success.

He exhibited on various occasions, the first being in the Salón Anual de los Dibujantes de la Argentina at the Galería Peuser in 1965. He participated in exhibitions in Knokke-Heist, Belgium in 1974 and 1976; in Montreal, Quebec, Canada in 1976; in the CAyC (Center of Art and Communication) of Buenos Aires in 1988; several times in the Society of Illustrators, in the Museum of American Illustration, he was selected for the exhibition Artists of The Nation, at Columbia University, in 1990/91; at Harvard University in 1991; in the Art Center College of Design of Pasadena, California, in 1992; and at Parsons School of Design in New York City in 1992.

In 1993, he participated in the collective exhibition: Human Rights, as seen by the world’s leading cartoonists, in Vienna, Austria, which was held together with the World Conference on Human Rights of the United Nations. In 2009, Cardo presented a sort of retrospective exhibition, Testimonios, in the Teatro Argentino de La Plata, an event organized by that same institution as well as by the Department of Art and Culture of the National University of La Plata. This was followed by: Psicomigraciones at the Centro Cultural Recoleta in Buenos Aires in 2009/10, Evocaciones in the Museo Dámaso Arce de Olavarría in 2010, and Testigo ocular in the Museo Castagnino de Mar del Plata in 2010.

He received many awards nationally and internationally, starting with the Gold Medal conferred upon him by the Association of Illustrators of Argentina in 1965, in which the jury included Demetrio Urruchúa and Raúl Soldi. Awards were presented to him from organisations in the United States such as the Society of Newspaper Design, the Society of Publication Design, the Society of Illustrators of New York, the Annual Print's Regional Design, the Society of Dimensional Illustrators. In addition, he received awards from the Aydin Dogan Foundation of Istanbul, Turkey in 2009; the Grand Illustration Award at the XVIII International Design Hall of Porto Alegre, Brazil in 2010; in the Museo Nacional da Imprensa of Portugal in 2010; the First Prize for Painting at the First Biennial Lucio Correa Morales in 2010, organized by the Cultural Institute of the Province of Buenos Aires, the Benito Quinquela Martin Museum, and the City of Navarro. He also received the First Prize How they see us (Cosi ci Vedono) in a ceremony organized by the FASI (Federazione Associazione Sarde in Italia) in Italy.

In 1987, he was nominated for the Pulitzer Prize by Jack Rosenthal. Together with Brad Holland, they are the only two illustrators that have been nominated for this award.

Articles about his work appeared in many magazines and newspapers, including: the legendary Upper & Lower Case, New York, in 1985, by the art critic Steven Heller, in Sourcebook of Visual Ideas by Steven Heller and Seymour Chwast, 1989

Another narrative about his work appeared in Newspaper Design for the Times, by Louis Silverstein, 1990,

Other publications that reviewed his work were, among others those in the journal Pasquim, from São Paulo, Brazil, in 1986; In Argentina Graphic (1987); in the journal of Applied Arts, 1992; in the magazine “SOMOS” (1988).

Among the many essays that were printed referring to his work were: Creative Unit by Alberto Collazo; Cardiology. Meeting with Horacio Cardo, A Giant of Illustration by Rodrigo Tarruela in Fierro magazine; the interview with the magazine MacWorld in Spain, 2009; Paintings Against Equalized Art, by Patricio Feminis; Horacio Cardo: The Vertigo of Creation and The Power of the Image, both by Mercedes Perez Bergliaffa, published in “EÑE” magazine, Jan, 2009; The Psychodrawing against Freud, in The Federal Magazine, 2009; Amazing Show by Horacio Cardo at de Mapda. The Splendour of the Essence by Guillermo Del Zotto, in the newspaper El Popular, 2010, and many others.

== Books ==
In 1998, Abbeville Press published a fiction book written, designed and illustrated by Cardo: The Story of Chess. This same book was later published in French, Portuguese and Spanish, the latter in a limited edition of 10,000 copies on the occasion of the largest event in chess history: 10,088 contenders played chess in the Zócalo Square, Mexico City (this record was recorded in the Guinness Book of World Records but was later superseded).

In 2009 Sigmund Fraude y Psicoanálisis (Sigmund Fraud & Psychoanalysis), written, designed and illustrated by Cardo, was published (an enlarged version, Sigmund Fraud & PXXXychoanalysis is about to be published in e-book format).

== Personal life ==
Following the termination of his first marriage by divorce, Cardo married Jerelle Kraus in New York City Hall on 16 February 1990. Kraus, an American Fulbright scholar, was then the editor of the Living section of the New York Times. He died on October 22, 2018, of complications caused by a stroke.
