= SR8278 =

Chemical compound

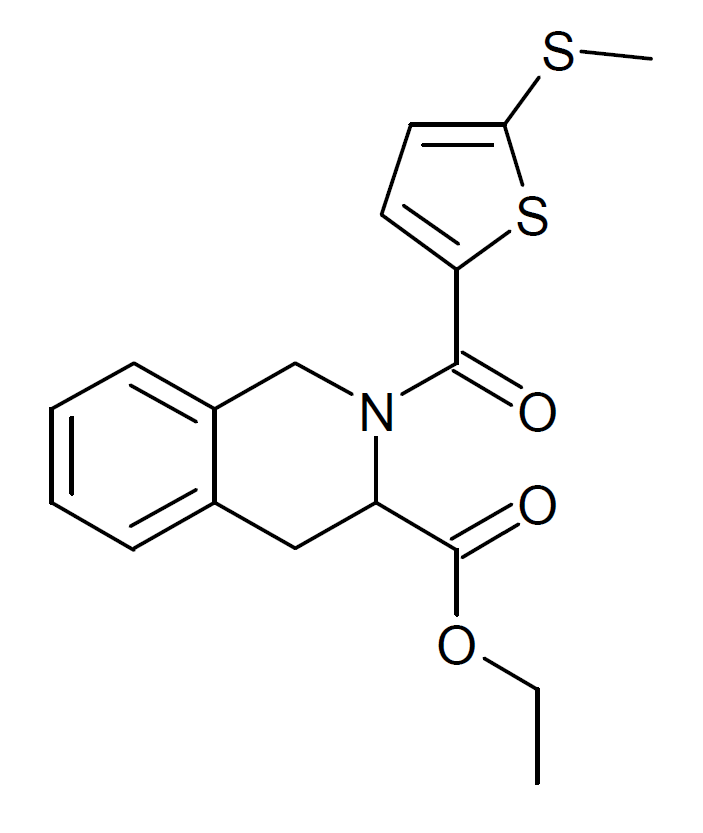

Identifiers
- IUPAC name: ethyl 2-(5-methylsulfanylthiophene-2-carbonyl)-3,4-dihydro-1H-isoquinoline-3-carboxylate
- CAS Number: 1254944-66-5
- PubChem CID: 53393127
- ChemSpider: 28189717
- CompTox Dashboard (EPA): DTXSID80693813

Chemical and physical data
- Formula: C_{18}H_{19}NO_{3}S_{2}
- Molar mass: 361.47 g·mol^{−1}
- 3D model (JSmol): Interactive image
- SMILES: CCOC(=O)C1CC2=CC=CC=C2CN1C(=O)C3=CC=C(S3)SC
- InChI: InChI=1S/C18H19NO3S2/c1-3-22-18(21)14-10-12-6-4-5-7-13(12)11-19(14)17(20)15-8-9-16(23-2)24-15/h4-9,14H,3,10-11H2,1-2H3; Key:UIEBLUZPSFAFOC-UHFFFAOYSA-N

SR-8278 is an experimental drug that was developed as an antagonist of Rev-ErbAα. It has been used to demonstrate potential applications of Rev-ErbAα antagonists in the treatment of conditions such as Duchenne muscular dystrophy and Alzheimer's disease.

== See also ==
- GSK4112
- SR9009
- SR9011
