= David Suter (biologist) =

David Suter, Swiss cell biologist

- Born: 1978 (age 47–48)
- Known for: Quantitative, time resolved analysis of gene expression in single living cells Single molecule imaging of transcription factor dynamics Mitotic bookmarking Stem cell biology

Academic background
- Education: Medicine; Piano
- Alma mater: University of Geneva

Academic work
- Discipline: Cell biology Molecular biology
- Sub-discipline: Quantitative analysis of gene expression Control of cell identity Stem cell biology Transcription factor dynamics Genomics
- Institutions: École Polytechnique Fédérale de Lausanne (EPFL)
- Website: https://www.epfl.ch/labs/suter-lab/

David Suter (born 1978 in Switzerland) is a Swiss physician and molecular and cell biologist. His research focuses on quantitative approaches to study gene expression and developmental cell fate decisions. He is currently a professor at EPFL (École Polytechnique Fédérale de Lausanne), where he heads the Suter Lab at the Institute of Bioengineering of the School of Life Sciences.

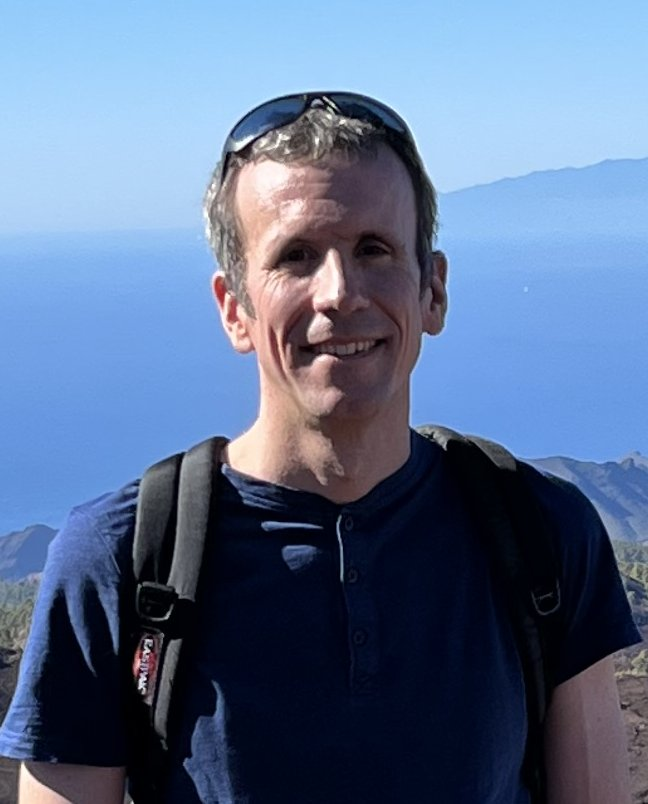
Picture of David Suter

== Career ==
Suter studied medicine at the University of Geneva and obtained his medical diploma in 2004. He graduated in 2007 with a PhD on embryonic stem cell differentiation and transgenesis, and in 2008, he received his Doctor of Medicine (MD) also from the University of Geneva.

In 2008, he joined the Laboratory of Ueli Schibler at the Department of Molecular Biology at the University of Geneva for a postdoctoral training. Here, he developed a new technology allowing ultra-sensitive monitoring of transcriptional kinetics in single living cells by luminescence microscopy. It allowed to demonstrate that mammalian genes are transcribed during short time windows, called transcriptional bursts, which have widely different kinetics properties for different genes. The key finding was that most mammalian genes have to transit through a refractory period when they are inactive before they can be activated again. Suter and colleges employed this approach to disentangle the effect of physiological stimuli on different bursting parameters. They also demonstrated the dynamic interactions of circadian transcription factors and their regulation by the proteasome.

In 2011, he became a post-doctoral fellow in the Laboratory of Xiaoliang Sunney Xie at Harvard University. Together with Christof Gebhardt, Suter developed a new technology allowing to visualize and measure the residence time of single molecules of transcription factors binding to DNA. Using this technology, they were able to determine the residence time of various transcription factors on DNA and allowed for the measurement of the fraction of DNA-bound molecules in the transcription factor population. Thereby they were able to distinguish three different modes of DNA binding (dimeric, monomeric, and indirect), and to simultaneously record DNA binding events of two heterodimeric partners. By extending the technology to determine the localization of single molecules of RNA polymerase II in mammalian nuclei, they showed that polymerases are mostly homogenously distributed throughout the nucleus, hence, arguing against a static model of clustering in transcription factories.

Since 2013 he has been a professor at EPFL, where he heads the Suter Lab at the Institute of Bioengineering of the School of Life Sciences.

== Research ==
The Suter laboratory is developing quantitative approaches to study gene expression in single living cells, and applying those to understand the molecular bases of cell fate decisions.

=== Quantitative analysis of gene expression in single living cells ===
Using luminescence microscopy for ultrasensitive monitoring of transcription in single embryonic stem (ES) cells, they studied the transmission of transcriptional activity through cell division. They discovered that the time scales of transcriptional memory varied over a range of two to ten cell cycles for different mammalian genes. They developed a novel approach based on a fluorescent timer to simultaneously monitor protein synthesis and degradation rates in live cells. In combination with pulse-chase protein labeling, they were able to determine how changes in synthesis and degradation rates shape fluctuations of proteins levels during the cell cycle. They also found that protein degradation rates varied broadly between individual cells, but were correlated to synthesis rates at the single cell level. This discovery suggests that cells are able to coordinate protein synthesis and degradation to buffer protein level variability and thereby to ensure robust control of protein homeostasis.

=== Master transcription factors and cell fate decisions ===
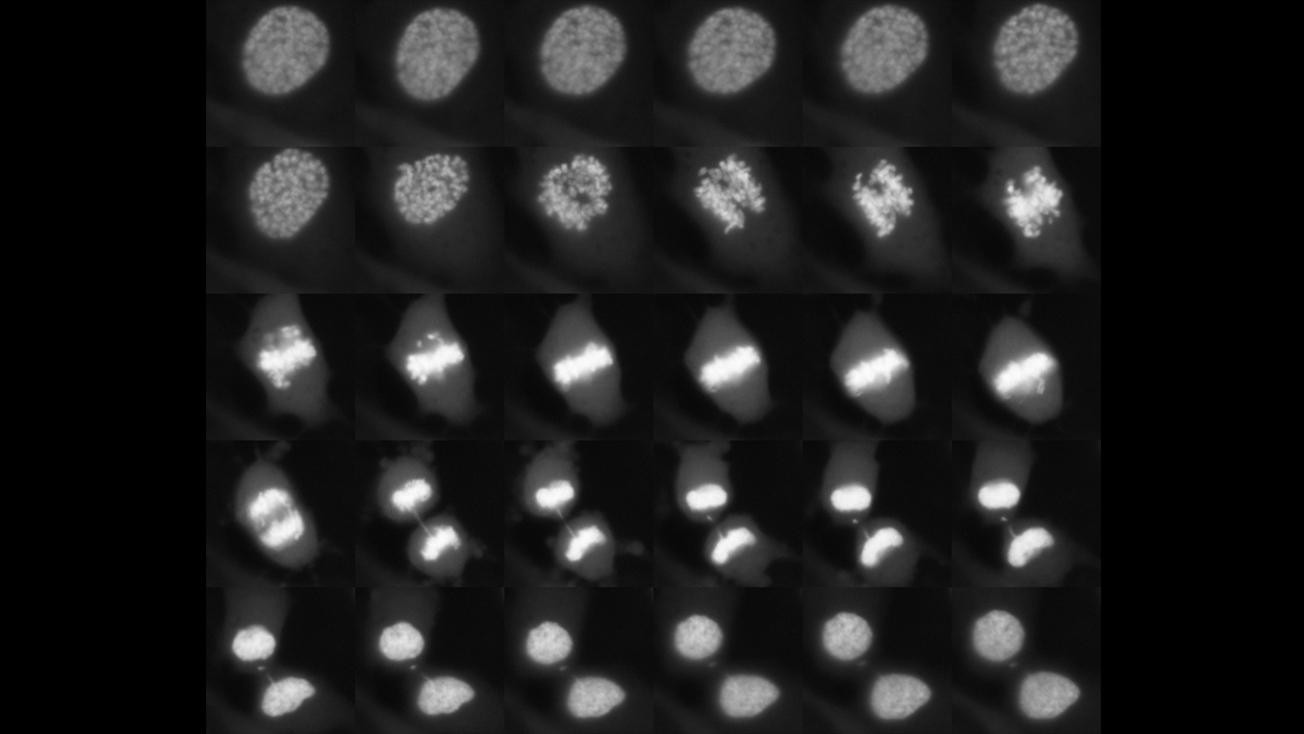
Fluorescence microscopy time series of a dividing cell, illustrating that the Sox2 transcription factor is retained on mitotic chromosomes. They also found that SOX2 plays a key role in maintaining cell identity during the transition from mitosis to interphase.

The Suter Lab is also interested in the impact of transcription factor fluctuations on cell fate decisions. They investigated whether fluctuations in the expression levels of OCT4 and SOX2, two master regulators of pluripotency, impact the differentiation potential of ES cells. They found that small endogenous fluctuations of OCT4 and to a lesser extent SOX2 significantly impact the potential of ES cells to commit to different germ layers. They also dissected the dynamic regulation of chromatin accessibility by the pioneer transcription factor OCT4 and demonstrated its activity on a time scale of minutes to maintain nucleosome-depleted regions in DNA regions regulating the identity of ES cells.

== Distinctions ==
Suter is a member of several institutions such as Board Member of the Swiss Stem Cell Network, International Society for Stem Cell Research (ISSCR) and European Society of Gene and Cell Therapy (ESGCT). Formerly, he held a Swiss National Science Foundation Professorship (2013-2019).

== Private life ==
Suter was born and grew up in Geneva, Switzerland. He has also earned a degree in classical piano from the Haute école de musique de Genève.. In 2025, he won the 1st prize at the Lavaux piano competition, category D (high level amateur pianists) https://www.lavauxclassic.ch/concours/concours-de-piano/

== Selected publications ==
- Friman, Elias T.; Deluz, Cédric; Meireles-Filho, Antonio CA; Govindan, Subashika; Gardeux, Vincent; Deplancke, Bart; Suter, David M. (2019). "Dynamic regulation of chromatin accessibility by pluripotency transcription factors across the cell cycle". eLife. 8. doi:10.7554/eLife.50087. PMC 6890464. PMID 31794382.
- Strebinger, Daniel; Deluz, Cédric; Friman, Elias T.; Govindan, Subashika; Alber, Andrea B.; Suter, David M. (2019). "Endogenous fluctuations of OCT 4 and SOX 2 bias pluripotent cell fate decisions". Molecular Systems Biology. 15 (9) e9002. doi:10.15252/msb.20199002. PMC 6759502. PMID 31556488.
- Phillips, Nicholas E.; Mandic, Aleksandra; Omidi, Saeed; Naef, Felix; Suter, David M. (2019). "Memory and relatedness of transcriptional activity in mammalian cell lineages". Nature Communications. 10 (1): 1208. Bibcode:2019NatCo..10.1208P. doi:10.1038/s41467-019-09189-8. PMC 6418128. PMID 30872573.
- Raccaud, Mahé; Friman, Elias T.; Alber, Andrea B.; Agarwal, Harsha; Deluz, Cédric; Kuhn, Timo; Gebhardt, J. Christof M.; Suter, David M. (2019). "Mitotic chromosome binding predicts transcription factor properties in interphase". Nature Communications. 10 (1): 487. Bibcode:2019NatCo..10..487R. doi:10.1038/s41467-019-08417-5. PMC 6353955. PMID 30700703. S2CID 59525214.
- Alber, Andrea Brigitta; Paquet, Eric Raphael; Biserni, Martina; Naef, Felix; Suter, David Michael (2018). "Single Live Cell Monitoring of Protein Turnover Reveals Intercellular Variability and Cell-Cycle Dependence of Degradation Rates". Molecular Cell. 71 (6): 1079–1091.e9. doi:10.1016/j.molcel.2018.07.023. PMID 30146318.
- Deluz, Cédric; Friman, Elias T.; Strebinger, Daniel; Benke, Alexander; Raccaud, Mahé; Callegari, Andrea; Leleu, Marion; Manley, Suliana; Suter, David M. (2016). "A role for mitotic bookmarking of SOX2 in pluripotency and differentiation". Genes & Development. 30 (22): 2538–2550. doi:10.1101/gad.289256.116. PMC 5159668. PMID 27920086.
