= Viktoriya Tokareva =

Russian writer (born 1937)

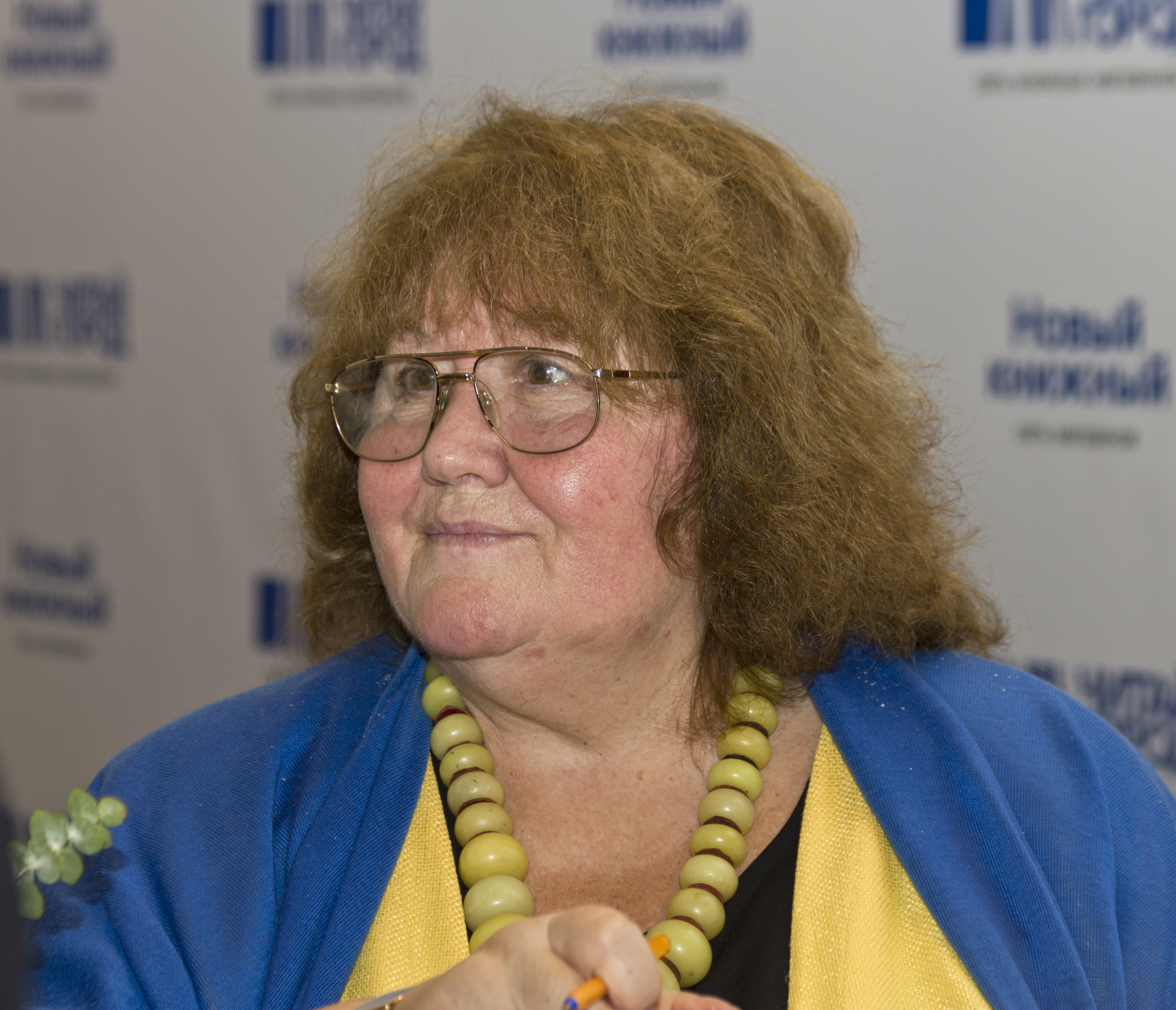
- Tokareva in 2013
- Born: Viktoriya Samuilovna Tokareva; 20 November 1937 (age 88); Leningrad, Soviet Union
- Occupations: Screenwriter and short story writer

Viktoriya Samuilovna Tokareva (Russian: Виктория Самуиловна Токарева; born 20 November 1937) is a Soviet and Russian screenwriter and short story writer. Her work has been translated into English and is available in several anthologies as well as in The Talisman and Other Stories - a book of Tokareva's short stories translated by Rosamund Bartlett. She lives in Moscow, where she continues to write.

== Biography ==
Viktoriya Tokareva was born in 1937 in Leningrad, in the Soviet Union. Her love for literature began at the age of twelve, when her mother read her "Skripka Rotschil'da" (“Rothschild’s Violin”), a short story by Chekhov. However, this love for literature did not immediately translate into a desire to be a writer – as a young woman, Tokareva initially applied to study medicine. When her application was rejected, she decided to study music instead, spending four years studying piano at the Nikolai Rimsky-Korsakov Saint Petersburg Conservatory.

In this, too, Tokareva was unsuccessful. Realizing that she would never become a musician, she found work as a music teacher instead, in a school on the outskirts of Moscow. However, this did not suit her either, and Tokareva decided to become an actress, enrolling in the State Institute of Cinematography in 1963. It was here that she discovered her talent as a writer and found her niche as a screenwriter. In her second year at the Institute, Tokareva published her first short story, “Den bez vran'ya,” or "A Day Without Lying,” in the literary magazine Molodaya Gvardiya. She has been writing steadily ever since. Her books to date include Happy End (1995), Vmesto menya (Instead of Me) (1995), and Loshadi s kryl'yami (Horses with Wings) (1996), and she has published often in the journals Novy mir and Yunost.

Tokareva’s characters tend to be ordinary people facing ordinary problems – people to whom her readers can easily relate. The majority of her characters are women, and as such she is regarded primarily as a women’s writer. Her writing can on occasion seem moralistic, upholding traditional values and gender roles, which has led to Western critics labeling her “pre-feminist.” Although she writes mainly in the realist tradition, she sometimes dips into what she calls "fantastic realism," weaving magical events into accounts of everyday lives.

== Critical responses ==
Tokareva's writing style is often compared to that of Anton Chekhov, whom she has acknowledged as one of her main influences. Another influence may be Sergei Dovlatov, whom Tokareva has claimed is her favorite contemporary Russian writer.

Critical response to Tokareva has been varied, with some Russian critics dismissing her as just another female writer, and critics abroad seeing her as a non-feminist writer less talented than the other popular female Russian writers: Lyudmila Ulitskaya, Tatyana Tolstaya, and Lyudmila Petrushevskaya. There has been little critical work conducted on Tokareva's work in the West thus far, although she is often mentioned by Helena Goscilo in her work on Russian female writing, and by Richard Chapple.

== Work in film ==
Tokareva began working with various Russian film directors starting in the late 1960s. To date, she has written fourteen screenplays, several of which were adapted from her short stories or books, including Sto gram dlya khrabrosti or 100 Grams for Bravery (1976) and Talisman (1983). Three of her films - Mimino (1977), Dzhentlmeny udachi, or Gentlemen of Fortune (1972), and Shla sobaka po royalyu, or A Dog was Walking on the Piano (1978) – were quite successful, with Mimino winning a gold medal at the 1977 Moscow International Film Festival.

== Bibliography ==
- День без вранья (A Day Without Lying) (1964)
- Когда стало немножко теплее (When It Became A Bit Warmer) (1972)
- Хеппи энд (Happy End) (1995)
- Джентльмены удачи (Gentlemen of Fortune) (1993)
- Лошади с крыльями (Horses With Wings) (1996)
- На черта нам чужие (The Devil Take Strangers) (1995)
- Коррида (Corrida) (1993)
- Сказать - не сказать (To Tell or Not Tell) (1991)
- Не сотвори (Make Not For Yourself An Idol) (1995)
- Лиловый костюм (The Lilac Suit) (1999)
- Кино и вокруг (Film And Around) (1998)
- Римские каникулы (Roman Holidays) (1996)
- Один из нас (One of Us) (1998)
- Телохранитель (Bodyguard) (1997)
- Из жизни миллионеров (From the Life of Millionaires) (2003)
- Розовые розы (Rose-colored Roses) (1999)
- Летающие качели: Ничего особенного (Flying Swings: Nothing Special) (1987)
- Летающие качели (Flying Swings) (1997)
- Гладкое личико (Plain Little Face) (1999)
- Всё нормално. Всё хорошо (Everything's Okay. Everything's Good.) (2000)
- Своя правда (One's Own Truth) (2002)
- Первая попытка (First Try) (2001)
- Стрелец (Sagittarius) (2000)
- Ничего особенного (Nothing Special) (1997)
- Вместо меня (Instead of Me) (1995)
- Лавина (Avalanche) (1997)
- Звезда в тумане (A Star in the Fog) (1999)
- Я есть (I Am) (1998)
- Можно и нельзя (Can And Can't) (1997)
- Этот лучший из миров (This Best of All Worlds) (1999)

== Screenwriting credits ==
- Урок литературы (A Literature Lesson) (1968)
- Джентльмены удачи (Gentlemen of Fortune) (1972)
- Сто грамм для храбрости (100 Grams for Courage) (1976)
- Мимино (Mimino) (1977)
- Шла собака по роялю (A Dog Was Walking on the Piano) (1978)
- Шляпа (The Hat) (1981)
- Талисман (Talisman - adapted from the short story) (1983)
- Маленькое одолжение (A Small Favor) (1984)
- Тайна земли (The Earth's Secret - adapted from the short story) (1985)
- О том, чего не было (About That, Which Did Not Happen - adapted from the story) (1986)
- Кто войдет в последный вагон (Who Will Enter the Last Car - based on the book Старая собака (Old Dog)) (1986)
- Стечение обстоятельств (Coincidence) (1987)
- Мелодрама с покушением на убийство (Melodrama With An Attempted Murder - adapted from the novella Пять фигур на постаменте (Five Figures on a Pedestal)) (1992)
- Ты есть... (You Are... - book adaptation) (1995)
- Вместо меня (Instead of Me - book adaptation) (2000)
- Лавина (Avalanche - book adaptation) (2001)

== Sources ==
- Виктория Самойловна Токарева at peoples.ru
- Bulashova, S. and I. Korchagina. "From an Interview with Viktoriia Tokareva: December 1989." Interpretation of Artistic Texts. Ed. M. I. Gorelikova. Moscow: University of Moscow Press, 194-196.
- Lyubov Popov and Radha Balasubramanian, Introduction to Viktoria Tokareva’s Life and Works, University of Nebraska Lincoln.
- Viktoria Tokoreva by Stephen Shenfield
- Interview with Victoria Tokareva
- Women's Prose
- Why A Russian Woman Would Go To A Burning Izba
