= Tolstoy: A Russian Life =

2010 biography of Leo Tolstoy by Rosamund Bartlett

- Author: Rosamund Bartlett
- Subject: Biography
- Publisher: Profile Books
- Publication date: 2010

Tolstoy: A Russian Life is a 2010 biography of Leo Tolstoy written by Rosamund Bartlett.

== Bibliography ==
- Blaisdell, Bob (November 8, 2011). "Tolstoy: A Russian Life". Christian Science Monitor. ISSN 0882-7729.
- Denner, Michael A. (2013). "Review of Tolstoy: A Russian Life". Slavic Review. 72 (3): 664–666. doi:10.5612/slavicreview.72.3.0664. ISSN 0037-6779. JSTOR 10.5612/slavicreview.72.3.0664. S2CID 164689220.
- Denner, Michael A. (2013). "Tolstoy: A Russian Life by Rosamund Bartlett". Slavic Review. 72 (3): 664–666. doi:10.5612/slavicreview.72.3.0664. ISSN 0037-6779. S2CID 164689220.
- Poe, Marshall (2012). "Identity Crisis: Who was the real Tolstoy?". The American Scholar. 81 (1): 128–129. ISSN 0003-0937. JSTOR 41435265.
- Richardson, Paul E. (November 18, 2011). "Tolstoy, Dostoyevsky and a Few Spies". Russian Life.
- Tayler, Christopher (November 14, 2010). "Tolstoy: A Russian Life by Rosamund Bartlett – review". The Observer. ISSN 0029-7712.
- Watson, Bruce (December 4, 2011). "'Tolstoy,' by Rosamund Bartlett". SFGATE.
