= Rosamund Bartlett =

British scholar of Russian literature

Rosamund Bartlett is a British writer, scholar, lecturer, and translator specializing in Russian literature.

Bartlett graduated from Durham University with a first-class degree in Russian. She went on to complete a doctorate at Oxford University.

Rosamund Bartlett is the author of Tolstoy: A Russian Life (2010) and translated Leo Tolstoy's Anna Karenina for Oxford University Press (2014). She is also the author of Chekhov: Scenes from a Life (2004) and has translated two volumes of Anton Chekhov's short stories.

As a translator, she published the first unexpurgated edition of Anton Chekhov's letters, and she was awarded the Chekhov 150th Anniversary Medal in 2010 by the Russian government for work her Chekhov Foundation has done in preserving the White Dacha, the writer's house in Yalta.

On 9 June 2022, Rosamund Bartlett gave a reading for the benefit of the victims of the Russian invasion of Ukraine at Queen's College from Trull, which consisted of a presentation on the sacred art of Kyiv, Odesa and Lviv.

== Selected works ==
- Victory Over the Sun: The World's First Futurist Opera (co-edited with Sarah Dadswell), 2012
- Tolstoy: A Russian Life, 2010
- Chekhov: Scenes from a Life, 2004
- Shostakovich in Context (editor), 2000
- Literary Russia: A Guide (co-authored with Anna Benn), 1997 & 2007
- Wagner and Russia (Cambridge Studies in Russian Literature), 1995

=== As translator ===
- Anna Karenina by Leo Tolstoy for Oxford World's Classics
- About Love and Other Stories by Anton Chekhov for Oxford World's Classics
- A Life in Letters, by Anton Chekhov for Penguin Classics (co-translator: Anthony Phillips)
- The Exclamation Mark, by Anton Chekhov for Hesperus Classics
- The Talisman and Other Tales by Viktoria Tokareva
