= G. Augustine Lynas =

American modern sculptor

G. Augustine Lynas is a sculptor of sand sculptures and other ephemeral materials, including snow. He also works in concrete, ceramic, bronze and most two-dimensional media (including murals, illustration, photography, etc.).

Lynas has been doing public sculptures since about 1956. He usually creates his sand sculptures spontaneously to be recycled by the tide, which encourages emotional attachment by the on-lookers to the disappearing art. When crowds form around his work, he uses the opportunity to remind his audience of the delicate ecology of the oceans and seashores. His works are usually representational, and often combine anatomical forms with architecture and landscape. Some pieces are enormous, some small. A few are dry and in low relief, while others are tall and highly detailed. Some employ optical illusions or gravity defying undercuts. His book and film, both titled "Sandsong", have been available through his website of the same name. Lynas has also created a sculpted concrete sand pit in Manhattan's Riverside Park, where the sand and its container are similar in color and texture so that children can create sand sculptures which appear to alter the concrete sculptures. Lynas also works in other ephemeral materials, including snow. In 1980 he was invited to build snow sculpture in the athlete's village during the Winter Olympics in Lake Placid, New York. More recently he has built concrete and bronze sculptures in seven New York City parks and playgrounds. They include Central Park, Marine Park, Riverside Park, McCarren Park and others. After a few years as a book designer for a major publisher Lynas has worked in New York City as a freelance designer/illustrator/photographer since 1970. He has published 6 books including: "The ABC's of Central Park, an Alphabet Guidebook", The ABCs of Riverside Park" and an interactive e-book called "Tammy & Blue" available through LynasPress.com. He also published "The ABCs of Brooklyn, An Alphabet Guidebook For All Ages" with photographer Peter Vadnai. Lynas is also a pioneer in the world of flying discs and was recently inducted into the Frisbee Freestyle Hall of Fame. He is the father of three, lives with his wife in Manhattan.

== See also ==
- Sand art and play
- International festival of sand sculpture
- Granular material
