= Digital back-propagation =

Digital back-propagation (DBP) is a technique for compensating all fiber impairments in optical transmission systems. DBP is a sort of non-linearity compensation (NLC). DBP uses the back-propagation algorithm in the digital domain by solving the inverse nonlinear Schrödinger equation of the fiber link using the split-step Fourier method (SSFM) to calculate the transmitted signal from the received signal.

In principle, digital back-propagation is capable of fully reversing the effects of nonlinear propagation in optical fibers, yet in practice it is limited by the stochastic nature of some impairments, like amplified spontaneous emission and polarization mode dispersion.
