= GSK-4112 =

Chemical compound

Identifiers
- IUPAC name: tert-butyl 2-[(4-chlorophenyl)methyl-[(5-nitrothiophen-2-yl)methyl]amino]acetate
- CAS Number: 1216744-19-2
- PubChem CID: 50905018
- ChemSpider: 24606038
- ChEMBL: ChEMBL1961795
- CompTox Dashboard (EPA): DTXSID701336675

Chemical and physical data
- Formula: C_{18}H_{21}ClN_{2}O_{4}S
- Molar mass: 396.89 g·mol^{−1}
- 3D model (JSmol): Interactive image
- SMILES: CC(C)(C)OC(=O)CN(CC1=CC=C(C=C1)Cl)CC2=CC=C(S2)[N+](=O)[O-]
- InChI: InChI=1S/C18H21ClN2O4S/c1-18(2,3)25-17(22)12-20(10-13-4-6-14(19)7-5-13)11-15-8-9-16(26-15)21(23)24/h4-9H,10-12H2,1-3H3; Key:WYSLOKHVFKLWOU-UHFFFAOYSA-N

GSK-4112 is an experimental drug that was developed by GlaxoSmithKline as an agonist of Rev-ErbAα. It is used for studying regulation of the circadian rhythm and its influence on diverse processes such as adipogenesis, regulation of bone density, and inflammation.

== See also ==
- SR8278
- SR9009
- SR9011
