= Suliana Manley =

American biophysicist

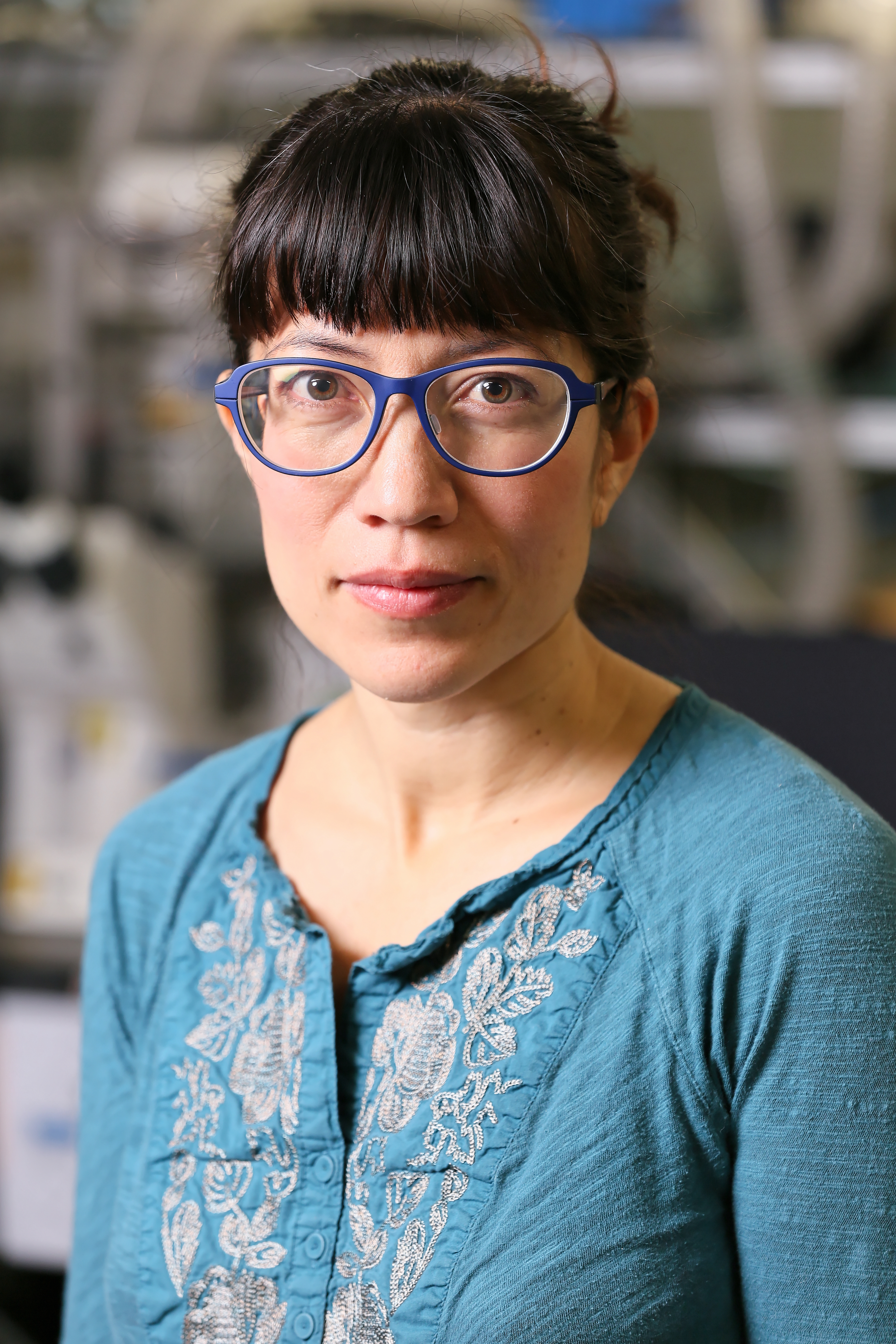
- Suliana Manley in her laboratory (2020)
- Born: 1975 (age 50–51)

Academic background
- Education: Rice University

Academic work
- Institutions: École Polytechnique Fédérale de Lausanne (EPFL)
- Main interests: Super-resolution fluorescence microscopy Single molecule imaging in cells Cellular biophysics Bacterial cell cycle
- Website: https://leb.epfl.ch

Suliana Manley (born 1975) is an American biophysicist. Her research focuses on the development of high-resolution optical instruments, and their application in studying the organization and dynamics of proteins. She is a professor at École Polytechnique Fédérale de Lausanne and heads the Laboratory of Experimental Biophysics.

== Career ==
Manley studied physics and mathematics at Rice University where she received a Bachelor's degree (cum laude) in 1997. She joined Harvard University and in 2004 graduated with a PhD in physics under the supervision of Dave A. Weitz. She then went to work as a postdoctoral researcher on lipid bilayer and red blood cell membrane dynamics with Alice P. Gast at MIT. In 2006, she joined the cell biology laboratory of Jennifer Lippincott-Schwartz at the National Institutes of Health as post-doctoral fellow. Here she developed an optical method (sptPALM) enabling the study of the dynamics of large ensembles of single proteins in membranes and inside cells.

In 2009, she became an assistant professor of physics at the École Polytechnique Fédérale de Lausanne, and was promoted to associate professor in 2016 and to full professor in 2022. She is the founding director of the Laboratory of Experimental Biophysics.

=== Recognition ===
In 2019, Manley was awarded the Medal for Innovation in Light Microscopy by Royal Microscopical Society. In 2020, she was elected as an APS (American Physical Society) fellow.

== Research ==
Manley's research group is invested in the field of high-resolution optical instruments and in the investigation of complex biological systems. They develop and deploy automated super-resolution fluorescence imaging techniques combined with live cell imaging and single molecule tracking. Their aim is to determine both the dynamics and the spatial distribution of protein assembly. They are also interested in the information transduction across cell membranes and therefore investigate the assembly dynamics of membrane-bound receptor.

Their main research topics involve:

- High-throughput and large field-of-view single molecule localization microscopies (SMLM) by application of microlens array (MLA)-based flat-field epi-illumination.
- Multicolor 3D single particle reconstruction from multicolor 2D SMLM images.
- Waveguide TIRF for high-throughput DNA-PAINT for better precision of target localization and continuous target sampling.
- Study of the physical and physiological signatures of mitochondria division and fusion.

== Publication ==
- Manley, Suliana; Gillette, Jennifer M.; Patterson, George H.; Shroff, Hari; Hess, Harald F.; Betzig, Eric; Lippincott-Schwartz, Jennifer (2008). "High-density mapping of single-molecule trajectories with photoactivated localization microscopy" (PDF). Nature Methods. 5 (2): 155–157. doi:10.1038/nmeth.1176. PMID 18193054. S2CID 1101468.
- Shtengel, G.; Galbraith, J. A.; Galbraith, C. G.; Lippincott-Schwartz, J.; Gillette, J. M.; Manley, S.; Sougrat, R.; Waterman, C. M.; Kanchanawong, P.; Davidson, M. W.; Fetter, R. D.; Hess, H. F. (2009). "Interferometric fluorescent super-resolution microscopy resolves 3D cellular ultrastructure". Proceedings of the National Academy of Sciences. 106 (9): 3125–3130. Bibcode:2009PNAS..106.3125S. doi:10.1073/pnas.0813131106. PMC 2637278. PMID 19202073.
- Lukinavičius, Gražvydas; Umezawa, Keitaro; Olivier, Nicolas; Honigmann, Alf; Yang, Guoying; Plass, Tilman; Mueller, Veronika; Reymond, Luc; Corrêa Jr, Ivan R.; Luo, Zhen-Ge; Schultz, Carsten; Lemke, Edward A.; Heppenstall, Paul; Eggeling, Christian; Manley, Suliana; Johnsson, Kai (2013). "A near-infrared fluorophore for live-cell super-resolution microscopy of cellular proteins". Nature Chemistry. 5 (2): 132–139. Bibcode:2013NatCh...5..132L. doi:10.1038/nchem.1546. hdl:11858/00-001M-0000-000E-BB40-E. PMID 23344448.
- Subach, Fedor V.; Patterson, George H.; Manley, Suliana; Gillette, Jennifer M.; Lippincott-Schwartz, Jennifer; Verkhusha, Vladislav V. (2009). "Photoactivatable m Cherry for high-resolution two-color fluorescence microscopy". Nature Methods. 6 (2): 153–159. doi:10.1038/nmeth.1298. PMC 2901231. PMID 19169259.
- Cipelletti, Luca; Manley, S.; Ball, R. C.; Weitz, D. A. (2000). "Universal Aging Features in the Restructuring of Fractal Colloidal Gels". Physical Review Letters. 84 (10): 2275–2278. Bibcode:2000PhRvL..84.2275C. doi:10.1103/PhysRevLett.84.2275. PMID 11017262.
- Patterson, George, Michael Davidson, Suliana Manley, and Jennifer Lippincott-Schwartz. "Superresolution imaging using single-molecule localization." Annual review of physical chemistry 61 (2010): 345-367. Doi:10.1146/annurev.physchem.012809.103444
- Burnette, Dylan T.; Manley, Suliana; Sengupta, Prabuddha; Sougrat, Rachid; Davidson, Michael W.; Kachar, Bechara; Lippincott-Schwartz, Jennifer (2011). "A role for actin arcs in the leading-edge advance of migrating cells" (PDF). Nature Cell Biology. 13 (4): 371–382. doi:10.1038/ncb2205. PMC 3646481. PMID 21423177. S2CID 8621546.
