= DBP (gene) =

Protein-coding gene in the species Homo sapiens

Identifiers
- Aliases: DBP, DABP, D-box binding PAR bZIP transcription factor, taxREB302
- External IDs: OMIM: 124097; MGI: 94866; GeneCards: DBP

Gene location (Human)
Chr.	Chromosome 19 (human)
Band	19q13.33	Start	48,630,030 bp
Band	19q13.33	End	48,637,379 bp

Gene location (Mouse)
Chr.	Chromosome 7 (mouse)
Band	7 B3|7 29.45 cM	Start	45,354,512 bp
Band	7 B3|7 29.45 cM	End	45,359,627 bp
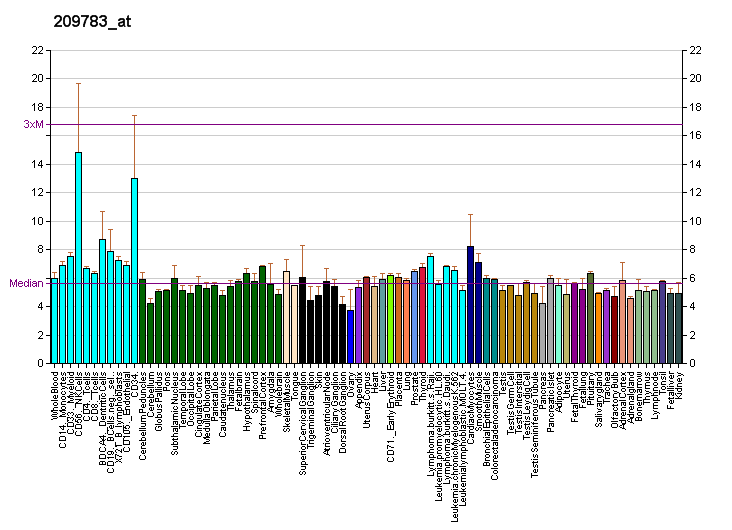

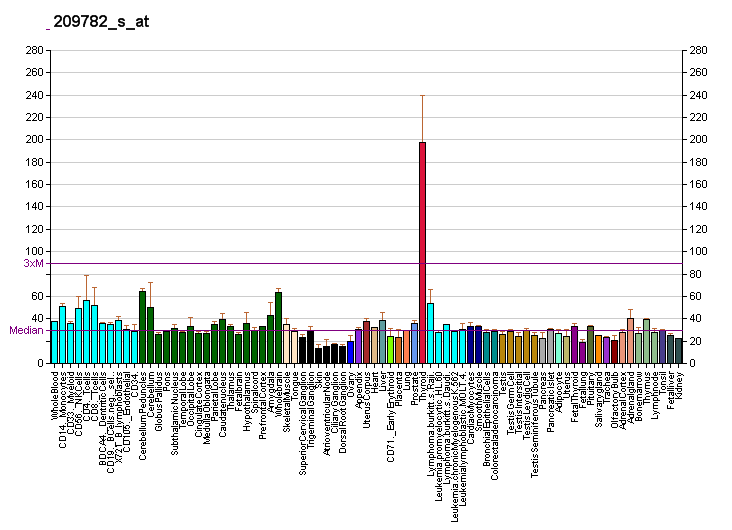
RNA expression pattern
Bgee	Human / Mouse (ortholog); Top expressed in: right hemisphere of cerebellum; right adrenal cortex; right frontal lobe; caudate nucleus; nucleus accumbens; prefrontal cortex; putamen; left adrenal cortex; cingulate gyrus; anterior cingulate cortex / Top expressed in: retinal pigment epithelium; Epithelium of choroid plexus; iris; olfactory tubercle; ankle; vestibular membrane of cochlear duct; nucleus accumbens; lacrimal gland; suprachiasmatic nucleus; substantia nigra; More reference expression data
BioGPS	More reference expression data
Gene ontology
Molecular function	DNA-binding transcription factor activity; DNA binding; DNA-binding transcription activator activity, RNA polymerase II-specific; RNA polymerase II transcription regulatory region sequence-specific DNA binding; DNA-binding transcription factor activity, RNA polymerase II-specific
Cellular component	nucleus
Biological process	regulation of transcription by RNA polymerase II; liver development; regulation of transcription, DNA-templated; transcription, DNA-templated; positive regulation of transcription by RNA polymerase II; rhythmic process; circadian rhythm; multicellular organism development; transcription by RNA polymerase II
Sources:Amigo / QuickGO
Orthologs
Databases	NCBI: entry; OMA: entry
Species	Human	Mouse
Entrez	1628	13170
Ensembl	ENSG00000105516	ENSMUSG00000059824
UniProt	Q10586	Q60925
RefSeq (mRNA)	NM_001352	NM_016974
RefSeq (protein)	NP_001343	NP_058670
Location (UCSC)	Chr 19: 48.63 – 48.64 Mb	Chr 7: 45.35 – 45.36 Mb
PubMed search
- Wikidata
View/Edit Human	View/Edit Mouse

D site of albumin promoter (albumin D-box) binding protein, also known as DBP, is a protein which in humans is encoded by the DBP gene.

DBP is a member of the PAR bZIP (Proline and Acidic amino acid-Rich basic leucine ZIPper) transcription factor family. DBP binds to an upstream promoter in the insulin gene.

DBP was shown to follow a stringent circadian rhythm; both the levels of protein and mRNA are almost non-detectable in the morning, but reach their maximum level in the evening.

== Discovery of circadian rhythm of expression ==
The circadian rhythm of the expression of DBP was discovered by chance in the laboratory of Ueli Schibler at the University of Geneva in 1990. A canadian postdoc working in the lab, Chris Mueller, had identified the DBP transcription factor.

However, when a new PhD student in the lab, Jérôme Wuarin, took over the project on DBP, he failed to observe any expression of the protein, and initially thought that the original experiment was flawed.

It was later discovered that the two researchers were working at different times of the day: Chris Mueller was a night owl and a late riser, and would isolate the transcription factor by mid-afternoon, while Jérôme Wuarin was an early riser and obtained the sample at 7:00. Following this discovery, Jérôme Wuarin repeated the experiment every 4 hour during a full day, and found that the expression of DBP changed by a 100-fold factor over the day, ranging from being undetectable in the morning to being easy to find in the afternoon. While many genes have been found to be transcribed rhythmically since this discovery, DBP remains the one that has the largest amplitude between its minimum and maximum expression.

While the researchers initially thought that the underlying mechanism was the rhythmic secretion of hormones, it became clear that the rhythmic expression of DBP was driven instead by cell-autonomous oscillators that are entrained by the master clock in the Suprachiasmatic Nucleus (SCN). Schibler and his colleagues followed this line of inquiry into the field of chronobiology.
