= David Suter (artist) =

American artist (born 1949)

- Born: 1949 (age 76–77); Bethesda, Maryland, U.S.
- Known for: Illustration, Painting, Sculpture

David Suter (born 1949) is an American artist known for his many years producing editorial illustrations for clients such as The Washington Post, Time, and The New York Times. Known as "Suterisms" or "visual koans", his illustrations are notable for their use of bistable perception, in which Suter combines multiple images and concepts into a single image. Suter is also an accomplished fine art painter and sculptor.

== Biography and illustration career ==
Suter grew up in Bethesda, Maryland, the son of Richard Sturgis Suter, who worked in the CIA, and Angela Phillips Suter, an artist. He was influenced early on by the mathematically inspired work of M. C. Escher, but never had any formal art training.

Suter attended a number of different colleges, not graduating from any of them. Drafted into the Army during the Vietnam War, he spent his deployment in West Germany.

Upon returning to the U.S., Suter got work at The Washington Post as an illustrator, for a while working as a courtroom artist during the Watergate scandal trials.

Suter was awarded a Michigan Journalism Fellowship in 1977, where he spent a year studying fine art, philosophy, and history at the University of Michigan. Upon completion of the fellowship, in 1978, Suter moved to New York City to pursue editorial illustration full-time. He quickly become sought after by such publications as The New York Times (both on the op-ed page and the book review), Time magazine (for whom he did a number of covers), Harper's Magazine, and the Chicago Tribune.

In a mid-1980s magazine profile, Suter described his work this way:

I don't think of them as puns. I like to think of them as equations. Every story suggests a certain number of images. And then there are other images, the visual clichés that are in everybody's mind and sort of make up their mental scenery, like the Pentagon, the Statue of Liberty, or the Cross. My mind is like a slot machine: You pull the lever and eventually one of the images from the article comes to rest next to a cliché that looks something like it. . . . It's a little like algebra. I try to combine the two images through a process of finding similarities and canceling out dissimilar aspects.

For many years, Suter has been working on creating a full-length animation of the complete text of Shakespeare's Hamlet.

In the late 2000s he retired from editorial illustration to work full-time on his painting and sculpture practices.

== Fine art ==
The first exhibition of Suter's fine art—which he terms "Constructivist Expressionist"—was in 1996 at the Morgan Rank Gallery in East Hampton, New York.

In 2011, he was arrested and detained in Serbia while transporting his paintings from France to Romania for a gallery show in Bucharest.

== Personal life ==
Suter has four daughters: Valerie, Georgia, Charlotte, and Olivia.

== Quotes ==
If it had been possible to graft M.C. Escher onto David Low, we might have had David Suter before now. Which is to say, an artist who can turn a political thought inside out and show you its cortical illusions. — Tom Wolfe

He doesn't simply create a striking accompaniment to the text, like most of my artists. His method actually transforms the author's argument into a new visual symbol. . . . No one can do them like him. — Jerelle Kraus, long-time art director of The New York Times op-ed page

Even his mediocre things are good, and his best things are brilliant. — Steven Heller

In some cases David gets to the essence of a subject more quickly and economically than the writer. If people say it's visual trickery, it's bloody good visual trickery. His work will stand up. — Nigel Holmes

== Bibliography ==
- (illustrator) Coming to Terms, by Wayne Biddle (Viking, 1981) ISBN 978-0670330928
- Suterisms (Ballantine Books/Available Press, 1986) ISBN 978-0345337436
- (illustrator) Keep Your Brain Alive, by Lawrence C. Katz and Robin Manning (Workman, 1999) ISBN 978-0761110521
