= Rev-ErbA alpha =

Protein found in humans

NR1D1
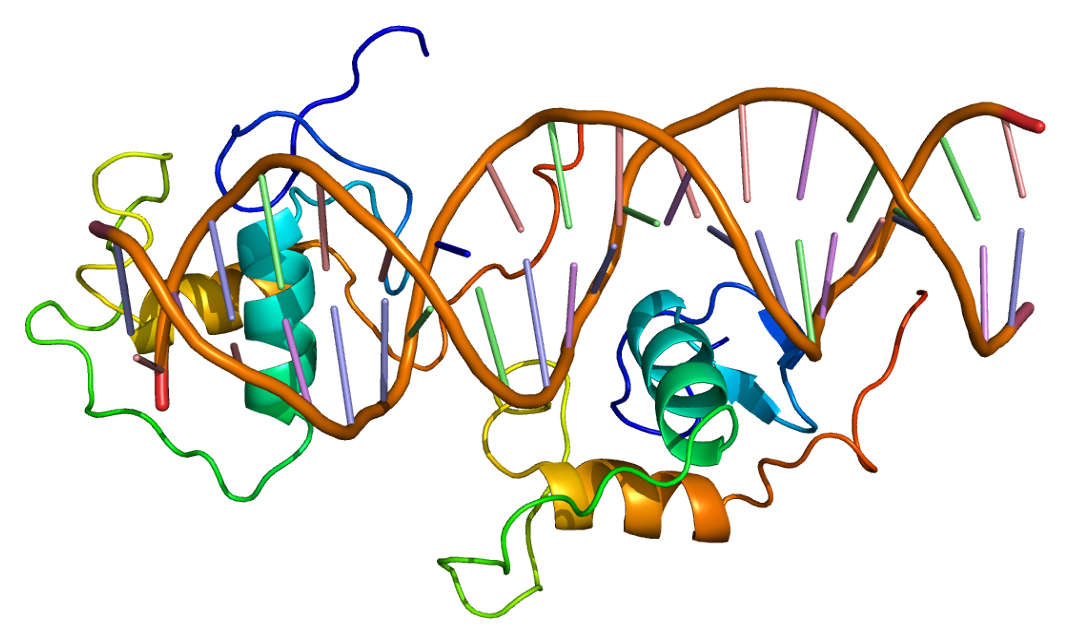

Identifiers
- Aliases: NR1D1, EAR1, THRA1, THRAL, ear-1, hRev, nuclear receptor subfamily 1 group D member 1, REVERBA, REVERBalpha
- External IDs: OMIM: 602408; MGI: 2444210; GeneCards: NR1D1
Available structures
PDB	Ortholog search: PDBe RCSB
PDB	List of PDB id codes 1A6Y, 1GA5, 1HLZ, 3N00

Gene location (Human)
Chr.	Chromosome 17 (human)
Band	17q21.1	Start	40,092,793 bp
Band	17q21.1	End	40,100,589 bp

Gene location (Mouse)
Chr.	Chromosome 11 (mouse)
Band	11|11 D	Start	98,658,758 bp
Band	11|11 D	End	98,666,159 bp
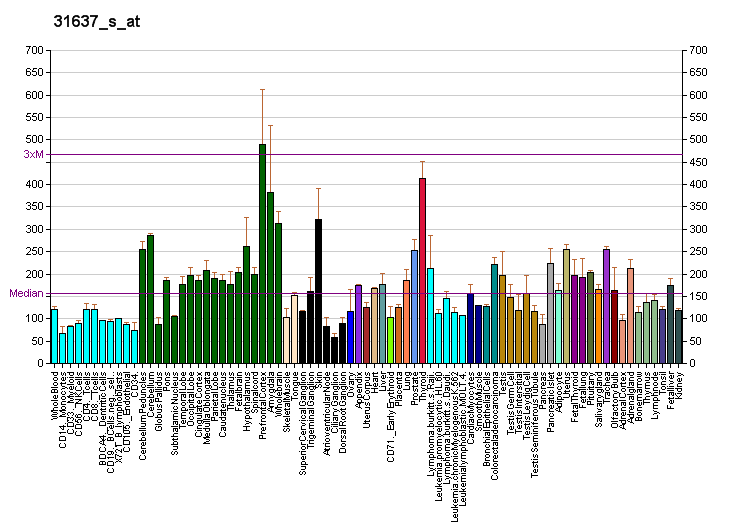

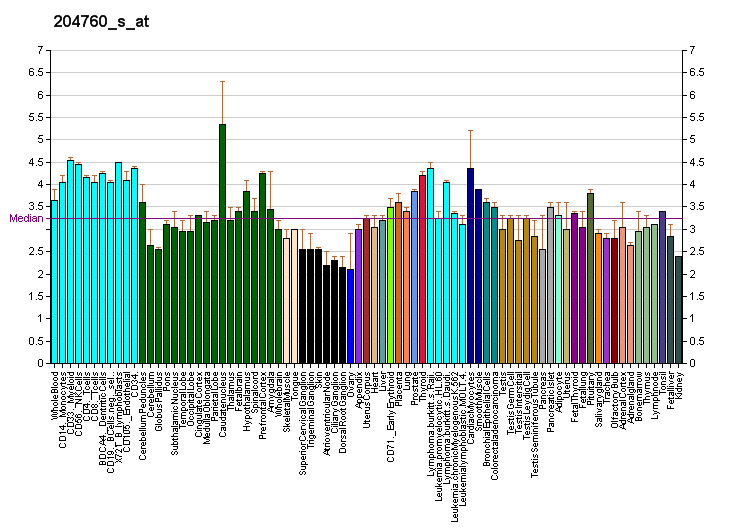
RNA expression pattern
Bgee	Human / Mouse (ortholog); Top expressed in: skin of leg; skin of abdomen; pancreatic ductal cell; right lung; ectocervix; tibialis anterior muscle; paraflocculus of cerebellum; Brodmann area 10; right hemisphere of cerebellum; nipple / Top expressed in: neural layer of retina; lip; ankle; superior frontal gyrus; esophagus; aortic valve; dentate gyrus of hippocampal formation granule cell; primary visual cortex; triceps brachii muscle; ankle joint; More reference expression data
BioGPS	More reference expression data
Gene ontology
Molecular function	DNA binding; sequence-specific DNA binding; RNA polymerase II transcription regulatory region sequence-specific DNA binding; transcription corepressor activity; DNA-binding transcription factor activity; zinc ion binding; metal ion binding; RNA polymerase II cis-regulatory region sequence-specific DNA binding; steroid hormone receptor activity; DNA-binding transcription repressor activity, RNA polymerase II-specific; nuclear receptor activity; core promoter sequence-specific DNA binding; protein binding; heme binding; transcription corepressor binding; DNA-binding transcription factor activity, RNA polymerase II-specific; E-box binding; transcription cis-regulatory region binding; transcription factor binding; nuclear receptor coactivator activity; signaling receptor activity
Cellular component	cytoplasm; cell projection; dendritic spine; nucleoplasm; dendrite; nucleus; nuclear body; RNA polymerase II transcription regulator complex
Biological process	cell differentiation; regulation of insulin secretion involved in cellular response to glucose stimulus; regulation of transcription, DNA-templated; rhythmic process; circadian temperature homeostasis; positive regulation of bile acid biosynthetic process; negative regulation of transcription by RNA polymerase II; circadian regulation of gene expression; regulation of fat cell differentiation; transcription, DNA-templated; positive regulation of transcription, DNA-templated; regulation of lipid metabolic process; glycogen biosynthetic process; regulation of circadian rhythm; circadian rhythm; proteasomal protein catabolic process; transcription initiation from RNA polymerase II promoter; response to leptin; negative regulation of transcription, DNA-templated; cellular response to lipopolysaccharide; regulation of type B pancreatic cell proliferation; negative regulation of toll-like receptor 4 signaling pathway; steroid hormone mediated signaling pathway; intracellular receptor signaling pathway; cholesterol homeostasis; multicellular organism development; hormone-mediated signaling pathway; response to lipid; positive regulation of transcription by RNA polymerase II; negative regulation of cold-induced thermogenesis; protein destabilization; regulation of circadian sleep/wake cycle; negative regulation of I-kappaB kinase/NF-kappaB signaling; negative regulation of inflammatory response; negative regulation of astrocyte activation; cellular response to interleukin-1; cellular response to tumor necrosis factor; negative regulation of neuroinflammatory response; negative regulation of microglial cell activation
Sources:Amigo / QuickGO
Orthologs
Databases	NCBI: entry; OMA: entry
Species	Human	Mouse
Entrez	9572	217166
Ensembl	ENSG00000126368	ENSMUSG00000020889
UniProt	P20393	Q3UV55
RefSeq (mRNA)	NM_021724	NM_145434
RefSeq (protein)	NP_068370	NP_663409
Location (UCSC)	Chr 17: 40.09 – 40.1 Mb	Chr 11: 98.66 – 98.67 Mb
PubMed search
- Wikidata
View/Edit Human	View/Edit Mouse

Rev-Erb alpha (Rev-Erbɑ), also known as nuclear receptor subfamily 1 group D member 1 (NR1D1), is one of two Rev-Erb proteins in the nuclear receptor (NR) family of intracellular transcription factors. In humans, REV-ERBɑ is encoded by the NR1D1 gene, which is highly conserved across animal species.

Rev-Erbɑ plays an important role in regulation of the core circadian clock through repression of the positive clock element Bmal1. It also regulates several physiological processes under circadian control, including metabolic and immune pathways. Rev-Erbɑ mRNA demonstrates circadian oscillation in its expression, and it is highly expressed in mammals in the brain and metabolic tissues such as skeletal muscle, adipose tissue, and liver.

== Discovery ==
Rev-Erbɑ was discovered in 1989 by Nobuyuki Miyajima and colleagues, who identified two erbA homologs on human chromosome 17 that were transcribed from opposite DNA strands in the same locus. One of the genes encoded a protein that was highly similar to chicken thyroid hormone receptor, and the other, which they termed ear-1, would later be described as Rev-Erbɑ. The protein was first referenced by the name Rev-Erbɑ in 1990 by Mitchell A. Lazar, Karen E. Jones, and William W. Chin, who isolated Rev-Erbɑ complementary DNA from a human fetal skeletal muscle library. Similar to the gene in rats, they found that human Rev-Erbɑ was transcribed from the strand opposite human thyroid hormone receptor alpha (THRA, c-erbAα).

Rev-Erbɑ was first implicated in circadian control in 1998, when Aurelio Balsalobre, Francesca Damiola, and Ueli Schibler demonstrated that expression of Rev-Erbɑ in rat fibroblasts showed daily rhythms. Rev-Erbɑ was first identified as a key player in the transcription translation feedback loop (TTFL) in 2002, when experiments demonstrated that Rev-Erbɑ acted to repress transcription of the Bmal1 gene, and Rev-Erbɑ expression was controlled by other TTFL components. This established Rev-Erbɑ as the link between the positive and negative loops of the TTFL.

== Genetics and evolution ==
The NR1D1 (nuclear receptor subfamily 1 group D member 1) gene, located on chromosome 17, encodes the protein REV-ERBɑ in humans. It is transcribed from the opposite strand of the human thyroid hormone receptor alpha (THRA, c-erbAα) so that NR1D1 and THRA cDNA are complementary on 269 bases. The gene consists of 7,797 bases with 8 exons, forming only 1 splice variant. The NR1D1 promoter itself contains a REV-ERB response element (RevRE), which allows for regulation of gene expression both through autoregulation and regulation by retinoic acid receptor-related orphan receptor alpha (RORɑ), another nuclear receptor transcription factor. NR1D1 also contains an E-box at its promoter, which allows for regulation by BMAL1. In humans, NR1D1 (REV-ERBɑ) is highly expressed in the brain and metabolic tissues, including skeletal muscle, adipose tissue, and the liver.

Genomic analysis suggests that the NR1D1 gene was present in the most recent common ancestor of all animals, with orthologs present in 378 species tested, including chimpanzees, dogs, mice, rats, chickens, zebrafish, frogs, and fruit flies. Comparison to the rat ortholog, Nr1d1, indicates high conservation in the DNA binding and carboxy-terminal domains, as well as conservation of transcription of c-erbA alpha-2 and Rev-Erbɑ on opposite strands. In humans, NR1D1 has only one paralog, NR1D2 (REV-ERBβ), which is located on chromosome 3 and likely arose from a duplication event. However, both NR1D1 and NR1D2 are members of the nuclear receptor family, indicating they share common ancestry. As such, NR1D1 is functionally related to other nuclear receptor genes, such as peroxisome proliferator activated receptor delta (PPARD) and retinoic acid receptor alpha (RARA). Furthermore, studies have shown that the NR1D1/THRA genetic locus is genetically linked to the RARA gene.

== Protein structure ==
The human NR1D1 gene produces a protein product (REV-ERBα) of 614 amino acids. REV-ERBα has 3 major functional domains, including a DNA-binding domain (DBD) and a ligand-binding domain (LBD) at the C-terminus, and a N-terminus domain which allows for activity modulation. These three domains are a common feature of nuclear receptor proteins.

The Rev-Erb proteins are unique from other nuclear receptors in that they do not have a helix in the C-terminal that is necessary for coactivator recruitment and activation by nuclear receptors via their LBD. Instead, Rev-Erbα interacts via its LBD with Nuclear Receptor Co-Repressor (NCoR) and another closely related co-repressor Silencing Mediator of Retinoid and Thyroid Receptors (SMRT), although the interaction with NCoR is stronger due to its structural compatibility. Heme, an endogenous ligand of Rev-Erbα, further stabilizes the interaction with NCoR. The repression by Rev-Erbα also requires interaction with the class I histone deactylase 3 (HDAC3) - NCoR complex. The catalytic activity of HDAC3 is activated only when it complexes with NCoR or SMRT, so Rev-Erbα must interact with this complex in order for gene repression to occur via histone deacetylation. It is still unknown whether other HDACs play a role in the function of Rev-Erbα. Rev-Erbα recruits the NCoR-HDAC3 complex through binding a specific DNA sequence commonly referred to as RORE due to its interaction with the transcriptional activator Retinoic Acid Receptor-related Orphan Receptor (ROR). This sequence consists of an "AGGTCA" half-site preceded by an A/T sequence.. Rev-Erbα binds in the major groove of this sequence via its DBD domain, which contains two C4-type zinc fingers. Rev-Erbα can repress gene activation as a monomer through competitive binding at this RORE site, but two Rev-Erbα molecules are required for interaction with NCoR and active gene repression. This can occur by two Rev-Erbα molecules binding separate ROREs or as a stronger interaction through binding a response element that is a direct repeat of the RORE (RevDR2).

In mice, it has been shown that the N-terminal regulatory domain contains an important site for phosphorylation by casein kinase 1 epsilon (Csnk1e), which aids in proper localization of Rev-Erbα, and furthermore, that this domain is necessary for activation of the gap junction protein 1 (GJA1) gene.

== Function ==
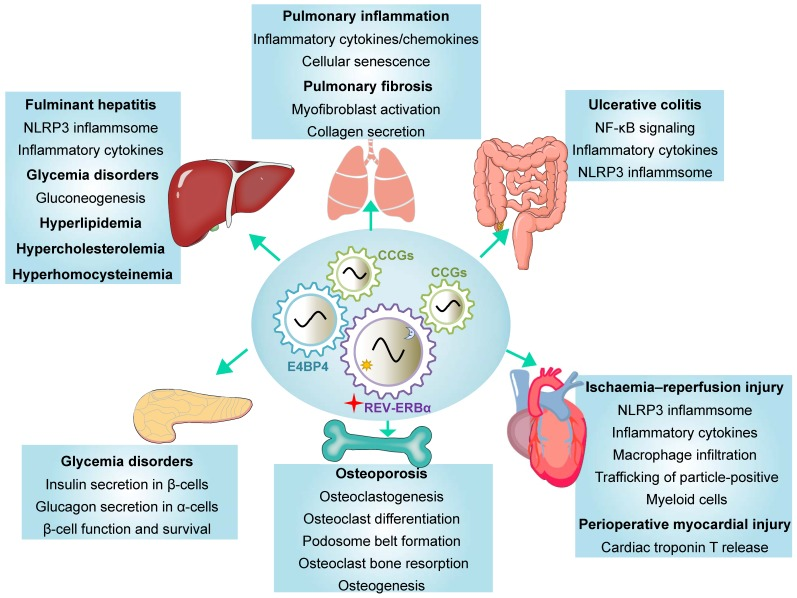
REV‑ERBα regulates clock-controlled genes (CCGs) to affect physiological processes in various tissues.

=== Circadian oscillator ===
Rev-Erbα has been proposed to coordinate circadian metabolic responses. Circadian rhythms are driven by interlocking transcription/translation feedback regulatory loops (TTFLs) that generate and maintain these daily rhythms, and Rev-Erbα is involved in a secondary TTFL in mammals. The primary TTFL features transcriptional activator proteins CLOCK and BMAL1 that contribute to the rhythmic expression of genes within this loop, notably per and cry. The expression of these genes then act through negative feedback to inhibit CLOCK:BMAL1 transcription. The secondary TTFL, featuring Rev-Erbα working in conjunction with Rev-Erbβ and the orphan receptor RORα, is thought to strengthen this primary TTFL by further regulating BMAL1. RORα shares the same response elements as Rev-Erbα but exerts opposite effects on gene transcription; BMAL1 expression is repressed by Rev-Erbα and activated by RORα. CLOCK:BMAL1 expression activates the transcription of NR1D1, encoding the Rev-Erbα protein. Increased Rev-Erbα expression in turn, represses transcription of BMAL1, stabilizing the loop. The oscillating expression of RORα and Rev-Erbα in the suprachiasmatic nucleus, the principal circadian timekeeper in mammals, leads to the circadian pattern of BMAL1 expression. The occupancy of the BMAL1 promoter by these two receptors is key for proper timing of the core clock machinery in mammals.

=== Metabolism ===
Rev-erbα plays a role in the regulation of whole body metabolism through controlling lipid metabolism, bile acid metabolism, and glucose metabolism. Rev-Erbα relays circadian signals into metabolic and inflammatory regulatory responses and vice versa, although the precise mechanisms underlying this relationship are not entirely understood.

Rev-erbα regulates the expression of liver apolipoproteins, sterol regulatory element binding protein, and the fatty acid elongase elovl3 through its repressional activity In addition, the silencing of Rev-erbα is associated with the reduction of fatty acid synthase, a key regulator of lipogenesis. Rev-erbα deficient mice exhibit dyslipidemia due to elevated triglyceride levels and Rev-erbα polymorphisms in humans have been associated with obesity. Rev-erbα also regulates adipogenesis of white and brown adipocytes. Rev-Erbα transcription is induced during the adipogenic process, and over-expression of Rev-erbα enhances adipogenesis. Researchers have proposed that Rev-erbα's role in adipocyte function may affect the timing of processes such as lipid storage and lipolysis, contributing to long term issues with BMI control. Rev-erbα also regulates bile acid metabolism by indirectly down-regulating Cyp7A1, which encodes the first and rate controlling enzyme of the major bile acid biosynthetic pathway.

Rev-erbα plays both indirect and direct roles in glucose metabolism. BMAL1 heavily influences glucose production and glycogen synthesis, thus through the regulation of BMAL1, Rev-erbα indirectly regulates glucose synthesis. More directly, Rev-erbα's expression in the pancreas regulates the function of α-cells and β-cells, which produce glucagon and insulin, respectively.

=== Muscle and cartilage ===
Rev-erbα plays a role in myogenesis through interaction with the transcription complex Nuclear Factor-T. It also represses the expression of genes involved in muscle cell differentiation and is expressed in a circadian manner in mouse skeletal muscle. Loss of Rev-erbα function reduces mitochondrial content and function, leading to an impaired exercise capacity. Over-expression leads to improvement.

This protein has also been implicated in the integrity of cartilage. Out of all known nuclear receptors, Rev-erbα is the most highly expressed in osteoarthritic cartilage. One study found that in patients with osteoarthritis has reduced Rev-erbα levels compared to normal cartilage. Research on rheumatoid arthritis (RA) has implicated the potential for treatment with Rev-erbα agonists to RA patients due to their suppression of bone and cartilage destruction.

=== Immune system ===
Rev-erbα contributes to the inflammatory response in mammals. In mouse smooth muscle cells, the protein up-regulates expression of interleukin 6 (IL-6) and cyclooxygenase-2. In humans, it controls the lipopolysaccharide (LPS) induced endotoxic response through repressing toll-like receptor (TLR-4), which triggers the immune response to LPS. In the brain, Rev-erbα deletion causes a disruption in the oscillation of microglial activation and increases the expression of pro-inflammatory transcripts.

Many immune and inflammatory proteins exhibit circadian oscillatory behavior, and research has shown that Rev-erbα deficient mice no longer exhibit these oscillations, notably in IL-6, IL-12, CCL5, and CXCL1, and CCL2. Rev-erbα has also been implicated in the development of group 3 innate lymphoid cells (ILC3), which play a role in regulating intestinal health and are responsible for lymphoid development. REV-ERBα promotes RORγt expression, and RORγt is required for ILC3 expression. Rev-erbα is highly expressed in ILC3 subsets.

=== Mood and behavior ===
Rev-erbα has been implicated in the regulation of memory and mood. Rev-erbα knockout mice are deficient in short term, long term, and contextual memories, showing deficits in the function of their hippocampus. In addition, Rev-erbα has been proposed to play a role in the regulation of midbrain dopamine production and mood-related behavior in mice through repression of tyrosine hydroxylase gene transcription. Dopamine related dysfunction is associated with mood disorders, notably major depressive disorder, seasonal affective disorder, and bipolar disorder. Genetic variations in human NR1D1 loci are also associated with bipolar disorder onset.

Rev-erbα has been proposed as a target in the treatment of bipolar disorder through lithium, which indirectly regulates the protein at a post-translational level. Lithium inhibits glycogen synthase kinase (GSK 3β), an enzyme that phosphorylates and stabilizes Rev-erbα. Lithium binding to GSK 3β then destabilizes and alters the function of Rev-erbα. This research has been implicated in the development of therapeutic agents for affective disorders, such as lithium for bipolar disorder.
