= Transcription translation feedback loop =

Transcription-translation feedback loop (TTFL) is a cellular model for explaining circadian rhythms in behavior and physiology. Widely conserved across species, the TTFL is auto-regulatory, in which transcription of clock genes is regulated by their own protein products.

== Discovery ==
Circadian rhythms have been documented for centuries. For example, French astronomer Jean-Jacques d'Ortous de Mairan noted the periodic 24-hour movement of Mimosa plant leaves as early as 1729. However, science has only recently begun to uncover the cellular mechanisms responsible for driving observed circadian rhythms. The cellular basis of circadian rhythms is supported by the fact that rhythms have been observed in single-celled organisms.

Beginning in the 1970s, experiments conducted by Ron Konopka and colleagues, in which forward genetic methods were used to induce mutation, revealed that Drosophila melanogaster specimens with altered period (Per) genes also demonstrated altered periodicity. As genetic and molecular biology experimental tools improved, researchers further identified genes involved in sustaining normal rhythmic behavior, giving rise to the concept that internal rhythms are modified by a small subset of core clock genes. Hardin and colleagues (1990) were the first to propose that the mechanism driving these rhythms was a negative feedback loop. Subsequent major discoveries confirmed this model; notably experiments led by Thomas K. Darlington and Nicholas Gekakis in the late 1990s that identified clock proteins and characterized their methods in Drosophila and mice, respectively. These experiments gave rise to the transcription-translation feedback loop (TTFL) model that has now become the dominant paradigm for explaining circadian behavior in a wide array of species.

== General mechanisms of TTFL ==
The TTFL is a negative feedback loop, in which clock genes are regulated by their protein products. Generally, the TTFL involves two main arms: positive regulatory elements that promote transcription and protein products that suppress transcription. When a positive regulatory element binds to a clock gene promoter, transcription proceeds, resulting in the creation of an mRNA transcript, and then translation proceeds, resulting in a protein product. There are characteristic delays between mRNA transcript accumulation, protein accumulation, and gene suppression due to translation dynamics, post-translational protein modification, protein dimerization, and intracellular travel to the nucleus. Across species, proteins involved in the TTFL contain common structural motifs such PAS domains, involved in protein-protein interactions, and bHLH domains, involved in DNA binding.

Once enough modified protein products accumulate in the cytoplasm, they are transported into the nucleus where they inhibit the positive element from the promoter to stop transcription of clock genes. The clock gene is thus transcribed at low levels until its protein products are degraded, allowing for positive regulatory elements to bind to the promoter and restart transcription. The negative feedback loop of the TTFL has multiple properties important for the cellular circadian clock. First, it results in daily rhythms in both gene transcription and protein abundance and size, caused by the delay between translation and negative regulation of the gene. The cycle's period, or time required to complete one cycle, remains consistent in each individual and, barring mutation, is typically near 24 hours. This enables stable entrainment to the 24 hour light-dark cycle that Earth experiences. Additionally, the protein products of clock genes control downstream genes that are not part of the feedback loop, allowing clock genes to create daily rhythms in other processes, such as metabolism, within the organism. Lastly, the TTFL is a limit cycle, meaning that it is a closed loop that will return to its fixed trajectory even if it is disturbed, maintaining the oscillatory path on its fixed 24-hour period.

== Prominent models ==
The presence of the TTFL is highly conserved across animal species; however, many of the players involved in the process have changed across evolutionary time within different species. There are differences in the genes and proteins involved in the TTFL when comparing plants, animals, fungi and other eukaryotes. This suggests that a clock that follows the TTFL model has evolved multiple times during the existence of life.

Regulation of Clock genes
Drosophila melanogaster
Positive Regulators	CYC, Clock
Negative Regulators	TIM, PER
Mammals
Positive Regulators	BMAL1, CLOCK
Negative Regulators	PER1, PER2, CRY1, CRY2
Neurospora
Positive Regulators	WC-1. WC-2
Negative Regulators	FRQ

=== Drosophila melanogaster ===
The TTFL was first discovered in Drosophila, and the system shares several components with the mammalian TTFL. Transcription of the clock genes, Period (per) and Timeless (tim), is initiated when positive elements Cycle (dCYC) and Clock (dCLK) form a heterodimer and bind E-box promoters, initiating transcription. During the day TIM is degraded; light exposure facilitates CRY binging to TIM, which leads to TIM's ubiquitination and eventual degradation. During the night, TIM and PER are able to form heterodimers and accumulate slowly in the cytoplasm, where PER is phosphorylated by the kinase DOUBLETIME (DBT). The post-transcriptional modification of multiple phosphate groups both targets the complex for degradation and facilitates nuclear localization. In the nucleus, the PER-TIM dimer binds to the CYC-CLK dimer, which makes the CYC-CLK dimer release from the E-boxes and inhibits transcription. Once PER and TIM degrade, CYC-CLK dimers are able to bind the E-boxes again to initiate transcription, closing the negative feedback loop.

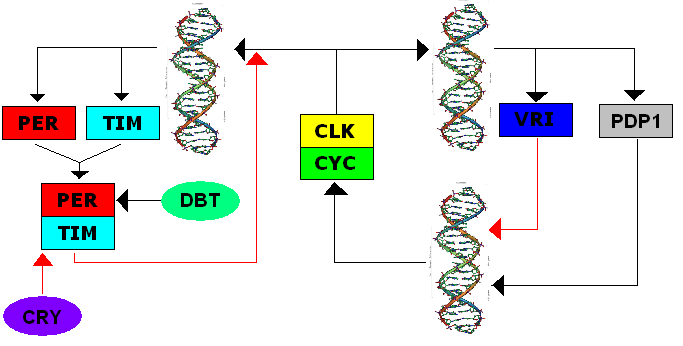
Figure shows the Drosophila melanogaster TTFL and their general interactions between the main players. In this case we can see how CLK and CYC are the positive regulators (yellow and green) and PER and TIM are the negative (red and blue) regulators that each play a role in the circadian clock.

Secondary feedback loops interact with this primary feedback loop. CLOCKWORK ORANGE (CWO) binds the E-boxes to act as a direct competitor of CYC-CLK, therefore inhibiting transcription. PAR-DOMAIN PROTEIN 1 ε (PDP1ε) is a feedback activator and VRILLE (VRI) is a feedback inhibitor of the Clk promoter, and their expression is activated by dCLK-dCYC. Ecdysone-induced protein 75 (E75) inhibits clk expression and tim-dependently activates per transcription. All of these secondary loops act to reinforce the primary TTFL.

Cryptochrome in Drosophila is a blue-light photoreceptor that triggers degradation of TIM, indirectly leading to the clock phase being reset and the renewed promotion of per expression.

=== Mammals ===
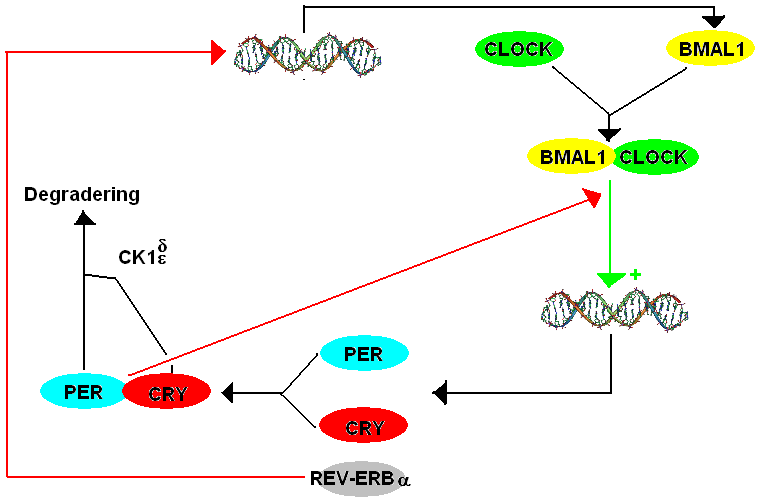
Figure shows the mammalian TTFL and the general interactions between the main players. This shows how PER and CRY both are negative regulators (red arrows) for BMAL1 and CLOCK, since they cause inhibition of BMAL1 and CLOCK by preventing transcription. BMAL1 and CLOCK (green arrows) are positive regulators since they encourage the transcription, and later the translation of PER and CRY.

The mammalian TTFL model contains many components that are homologs of the ones found in Drosophila. The way the mammalian system works is that BMAL1 forms a heterodimer with CLOCK to initiate transcription of mPer and cryptochrome (cry). There are three paralogs, or historically similar genes that now appear as a duplication, of the period gene in mammals listed as mPer1, mPer2, and mPer3. There are also two paralogs of cryptochrome in mammals. PER and CRY proteins form a heterodimer, and PER's phosphorylation by CK1δ and CK1ε regulates the localization of the dimer to the nucleus. In the nucleus, PER-CRY negatively regulates the transcription of their cognate genes by binding BMAL1-CLOCK and causing their release from the E-box promoter.

Although the mPer paralogs work together as a functional ortholog of dPer, they each have a distinguished function. mPer1 and mPer2 are necessary for clock function in the brain, while mPer3 only plays a discernible role in the circadian rhythms of peripheral tissues. Knocking out either mPer1 or mPer2 causes a change in period, with mPer1 knockouts free-running with a shorter period and mPer2 knockouts free running with a longer period compared to the original tau before eventually becoming arrhythmic. Similarly, mCry1 knockouts result in a shortened period and mCry2 knockouts result in a lengthened period, with a double mCry1/mCry2 knockouts result in arrhythmicity.

There are also secondary loops in mammals, although they are more complex than those seen in Drosophila. Like CWO in Drosophila, Deleted in esophageal cancer1,2 (Dec1 Dec2) repress mPer expression by binding E-boxes which prevents CLOCK-BMAL1 from binding their targets. The receptors REV-ERB and retinoic acid-related orphan receptor (ROR) play a similar role to PDP1ε and VRI in Drosophila, except they regulate CLOCK's binding partner BMAL1 instead of directly regulating CLOCK. D site-binding protein (DBP) and E4-binding protein (E4BP4) bind to the D-Box promoter sequence to regulate mPer expression.

The way these genes relate to Drosophila melanogaster is seen in the function of each of the genes and how they have evolutionarily changed. BMAL1 is an ortholog of CYCLE. This means that BMAL1 and CYCLE appear to have a common history, but are found in different species. Another example of the parallels between Drosophila melanogaster and mammals is also seen in cry and mPer since they are functional orthologs of per and tim.

=== Fungi: Neurospora ===
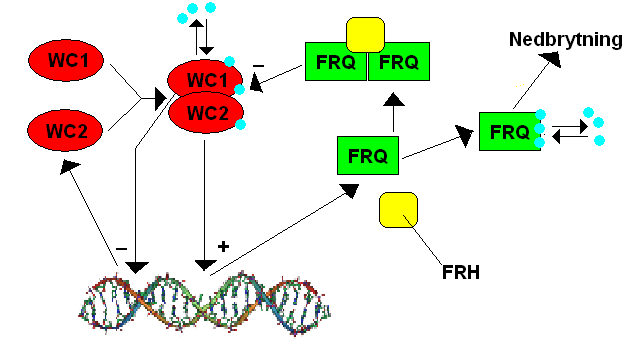
Overview of the Neurospora TTFL and the general interactions between the regulators. In this case WC-1 and WC-2 (red) are seen as the positive elements where they come together to encourage transcription of FRQ. FRQ (green) is the negative regulator which after translation, comes back as negative feedback.

The gene frequency (frq) in Neurospora was identified as the second known clock gene in 1979 by JF Feldman and his colleagues. Frq was first cloned in 1989 by CR McClung and his colleagues. This gene was of particular interest because its expression is very complex compared to other known microbial genes. Two positive regulator proteins, White Collar-1 (WC-1) and White Collar-2 (WC-2) bind the frq promoter, which is called the Clock Box, during late subjective night to activate transcription. Light is also important for inducing FRQ expression; WC-1 is a photopigment, and light allows WC-1 and WC-2 to bind another promoter called the proximal light-response element (PLRE). FRQ protein negatively regulates the activity of WC-1 and WC-2. Several kinases (CK1, CK2, and PRD-4/checkpoint kinase 2) and phosphatases (PP1 and PP2A) regulate the ability of FRQ to translocate to the nucleus and FRQ, WC-1 and WC-2 stability.

=== Plants: Arabidopsis thaliana ===
The first TTFL model was proposed for Arabidopsis thaliana in 2001 and included two MYB transcription factors, LATE ELONGATED HYPOCOTYL (LHY), CIRCADIAN CLOCK ASSOCIATED 1 (CCA1), and TIMING OF CAB EXPRESSION 1 (TOC1). CCA1 and LHY are expressed in the morning, and interact together to repress the expression of TOC1. CCA1 and LHY expression decreases in the darkness, allowing for TOC1 to express and negatively regulate CCA1 and LHY expression. CCA1 and LHY can also bind to their own promoter to repress their own transcription.

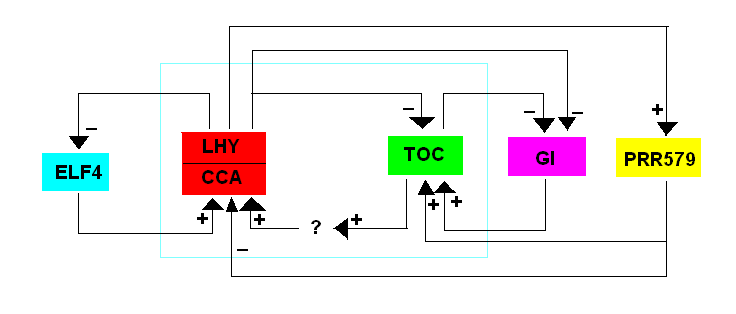
Figure shows the TTFL of plants (Arabidopsis). This shows how the different regulators function and how this still qualifies to be a TTFL because of the feedback loops that occur.

A second loop exists involving PRR9, PRR7, and PRR5, which are all homologs of TOC1 and repress CCA1 and LHY expression. These PRR genes are directly repressed by LHY and TOC1. These genes are also regulated by the "evening complex" (EC), which is formed by LUX ARRHYTHMO (LUX), EARLY FLOWERING 3 (ELF3) and EARLY FLOWERING 4 (ELF4). LUX is a transcription factor with a similar function to MYB, while ELF3 and ELF4 are nuclear proteins whose functions are unknown. The "evening complex" indirectly promotes the expression of LHY and CCA1, which repress transcription of its own components. Since this model consists of two inhibitions leading to an activation, it is also referred to as a repressilator.

A recently discovered loop includes the reveille (reveille) family of genes, which are expressed in the morning and induce transcription of evening genes such as PRR5, TOC1, LUX, and ELF4. Once the resulting proteins are translated, PRR9, PRR7, and PRR5 repress RVE8. RVE8 also interacts with the NIGHT LIGHT-INDUCIBLE AND CLOCK-REGULATED (LNK1, 2, 3, and 4) morning components, with LNKs either antagonizing or co-activating RVE8.

Although GIGANTEA (GI) is not known as a core part of the Arabdopsis TTFL model, it is repressed by CCA1, LHY and TOC1. Additionally, GI activates CCA1 and LHY expression.

=== Cyanobacteria ===
Studies of the cyanobacteria clock led to the discovery of three essential clock genes: KaiA, KaiB, and KaiC. Initially, these proteins were thought to follow the TTFL model similar to that proposed for eukarya, as there was a daily pattern in mRNA and protein abundance and level of phosphorylation, negative feedback of proteins on their cognate genes, resetting of clock phase in response to KaiC over-expression, and modified Kai activity through interactions with one another. Each of these results was consistent with understandings of the TTFL at the time. However, later studies have since concluded that post translational modifications such as phosphorylation are more important for clock control. When promoters for the Kai proteins were replaced with non-specific promoters, there was no interruption of the central feedback loop, as would be expected if inhibition occurred through the proteins' feedback onto their specific promoters. As a consequence, the TTFL model has largely been determined to be inaccurate for cyanobacteria; transcriptional regulation is not the central process driving cyanobacteria rhythms. Though transcriptional and translational regulation are present, they were deemed to be effects of the clock rather than necessary for clock function.

== Alternatives to the TTFL model ==
Post-translational feedback loops (PTFLs) involved in clock gene regulation have also been uncovered, often working in tandem with the TTFL model. In both mammals and plants, post-translational modifications such as phosphorylation and acetylation regulate the abundance and/or activity of clock genes and proteins. For example, levels of phosphorylation of TTFL components have been shown to vary rhythmically. These post-translational modifications can serve as degradation signals, binding regulators, and signals for the recruitment of additional factors.

Notably, cyanobacteria demonstrate rhythmic 24-hour changes in phosphorylation in a feedback loop that is independent of transcription and translation: circadian rhythms in phosphorylation are observed when the feedback loop Kai proteins are placed in a test tube with ATP, independent of any other cellular machinery. This three-protein post-translational system is widely accepted to be the core oscillator, both necessary and sufficient to drive daily rhythms. In addition to the Kai system in cyanobacteria, oxidation of peroxiredoxin proteins has been shown to occur independently of transcription and translation in both mammalian red blood cells and algae Ostreococcus tauri cells; this system has been seen to be conserved in many organisms. It is not clear whether the peroxiredoxin system interacts with TTFL-based clocks or is itself a part of a new PTFL-based clock. However, both of these findings imply that in some organisms or cell types, PTFLs are sufficient to drive circadian rhythms.

== See also ==
- Chronobiology
- Circadian Rhythm
- Familial sleep traits
- Period (Per) gene
