= Jeffrey L. Price =

American geneticist

Jeffrey Price
- Born: 1958 (age 67–68); New York City, New York
- Education: Undergraduate: College of William and Mary; Ph.D.: Johns Hopkins University
- Known for: Circadian rhythms research
- Scientific career
- Fields: Chronobiology, Neurology, Cognitive Neuroscience
- Workplaces: University of Missouri-Kansas City; Member of Society for Research on Biological Rhythms
- Academic advisors: Michael W. Young
- Website: sbs.umkc.edu

Jeffrey L. Price (born 1958) is an American researcher and author in the fields of circadian rhythms and molecular biology. His chronobiology work with Drosophila melanogaster has led to the discoveries of the circadian genes timeless (tim) and doubletime (dbt), and the doubletime regulators spaghetti (SPAG) and bride of doubletime (BDBT).

== Background and education ==
Price was born in New York City and raised in New Jersey and Virginia. He graduated from the College of William and Mary with a Bachelor of Science degree in biology, and later received his Ph.D. in biology from Johns Hopkins University. He completed his postdoctoral training in Taiwan, Republic of China, and in the lab of Michael Young at Rockefeller University through the Howard Hughes Medical Institute. Price is currently an associate professor in the School of Biological Sciences at University of Missouri-Kansas City, and an associate professor in the department of Neurology and Cognitive Neuroscience at the University of Missouri–Kansas City School of Medicine.

== Research interests ==
Price's research centers around the molecular mechanisms of circadian rhythms, using Drosophila melanogaster as model organisms. He is specifically interested in the role of protein kinases in clock function, and using forward genetics screens Price has contributed to the identification and characterization of many critical elements of the Drosophila circadian clock.

The molecular circadian clock of D. melanogaster can be described as a feedback loop of transcription and translation, in which the proteins CLOCK and CYCLE act as transcriptional activators of the period and timeless genes. Their protein products, PER and TIM, respectively, dimerize and translocate to the nucleus after phosphorylation by DBT. In the nucleus, PER/TIM heterodimers bind to and suppress CLK/CYC heterodimers to inhibit the transcription of period and timeless, resulting in daily oscillations of PER and TIM. DBT is itself regulated by BDBT and SPAG, which stimulate its kinase activity toward PER and increase the cytoplasmic stability of DBT, respectively.

== Timeline of selected major research contributions ==
- 1994: Identification and characterization of timeless mutant flies
- 1998: Identification and characterization of double-time mutant flies
- 2013: Identification and characterization of bride of double-time
- 2015: Identification of SPAG as a link between the clock and neurodegeneration

=== Timeless ===
In 1994, Price, together with Amita Sehgal, identified the timeless gene through forward genetics mutagenesis screens. A mutant Drosophila line was generated displaying arrhythmia in time of eclosion and per mRNA cycling, reliable phase markers for the Drosophila circadian clock. Price and Seghal mapped the mutations to chromosome 2 and termed the novel gene timeless. Leslie Vosshall, one of their collaborators, later noted that tim mutants were unable to localize PER protein to the nucleus, suggesting an interaction between PER and TIM. Price later contributed to the characterization of six mutant tim alleles altering circadian rhythm, providing further evidence for its role in clock function.

=== Double-time ===
In 1998, Price, together with Justin Blau and Adrian Rothenfluh, characterized three mutant alleles of another novel clock gene, doubletime, or dbt, through forward genetics mutagenesis screens and mapped the mutations to chromosome 3. The mutations, termed dbt ^{S}, dbt ^{L}, and dbt ^{P}, shortened (dbt ^{S}) or lengthened (dbt ^{L}) circadian rhythms in Drosophila. Dbt ^{P} was lethal to pupae, but Price and Blau noted that mutant strains of Drosophila larvae harboring homozygous dbt ^{P} mutations also sustained loss of rhythms in PER and TIM protein levels, as well as constitutive accumulation of PER protein. These results suggested that the normal function of DBT is to reduce the stability of PER protein monomers through phosphorylation status. The identification of double-time provided a crucial explanation for the observed 4-6-hour delay between peak per mRNA levels and peak PER protein levels in the Drosophila clock.

In addition to studying kinase function in D. melanogaster, Price studies the role of protein kinases in vertebrate clocks. Evolutionary analysis has shown DBT has orthologs in the mammalian genome, specifically CK1ε and CK1δ of the Casein kinase 1 family of kinases, suggesting that the mammalian clock may contain kinases with similar function. The mammalian clock has since been well characterized, and both CK1ε and CK1δ appear to perform a similar function to DBT, though CK1δ may have a larger effect on clock function.

=== Bride of Double-time ===
In 2013, Price's lab identified a noncanonical FK506-binding protein named Bride of Double-time (BDBT), which interacts with DBT protein kinase. In his experiment, RNA interference (RNAi), which reduced BDBT expression, resulted in long periods and arrhythmicity of locomotion, as well as high levels of hypophosphorylated nuclear PER and phosphorylated DBT. These results demonstrated a role for BDBT in the circadian clock. When BDBT was overexpressed, Price found that the phosphorylation and DBT-dependent degradation of PER increased, suggesting that BDBT stimulates DBT circadian activity toward PER. In addition, BDBT was shown to rhythmically accumulate in PER and DBT-dependent cytosolic foci in the fly eye. Price's lab established BDBT as a mediator of DBT's effects on PER, which regulates PER nuclear accumulation in discrete foci In photoreceptors. In 2015, Price's lab noted that DBT proteins lacking a nuclear localization signal (NLS) failed to interact with BDBT, suggesting that this interaction is mediated by the NLS.

=== Spaghetti ===
In 2015, Price identified an upstream regulator of DBT named spaghetti, encoding the SPAG protein. SPAG antagonizes DBT autophosphorylation, increasing the stability of DBT during the day by delaying proteasomal degradation. Using RNAi, Price found that SPAG knockdowns in Drosophila caused either an increase in period or arhythmicity, as well as reduction in cellular levels of DBT. SPAG also has a role in neurodegeneration, as flies with reduced SPAG experienced increased levels of activated caspase proteins in the optic lobes, resulting in neurodegeneration through apoptosis when human tau is also expressed in the eye.
