= Paul Hardin (chronobiologist) =

American chronobiologist (born 1960)

- Born: September 14, 1960 (age 65); Hazel Crest, Illinois
- Education: Southern Methodist University; Indiana University Bloomington; Brandeis University
- Awards: Aschoff-Honma Prize
- Scientific career
- Fields: Genetics; Chronobiology
- Workplaces: Texas A&M University; University of Houston
- Doctoral advisor: William H. Klein
- Other academic advisors: Michael Rosbash

Paul Hardin (born September 14, 1960) is an American scientist in the field of chronobiology and a pioneering researcher in the understanding of circadian clocks in flies and mammals. Hardin currently serves as a distinguished professor in the biology department at Texas A&M University. He is best known for his discovery of circadian oscillations in the mRNA of the clock gene Period (per), the importance of the E-Box in per activation, the interlocked feedback loops that control rhythms in activator gene transcription, and the circadian regulation of olfaction in Drosophila melanogaster. Born in a suburb of Chicago, Matteson, Illinois, Hardin currently resides in College Station, Texas, with his wife and three children.

== Academic career ==
Hardin earned his B.S. in biology at Southern Methodist University (SMU) in 1982. He then continued to pursue a Ph.D in genetics from Indiana University Bloomington in 1987 with William H. Klein. He went on to conduct his postdoctoral research at Brandeis University under the supervision of chronobiologist Michael Rosbash. From 1991 to 1995, Hardin worked as a professor at Texas A&M University, and from 1995 to 2005 at the University of Houston. Since 2005, Hardin has worked as a professor and researcher in the biology department at Texas A&M University. He teaches courses on introductory biology, molecular cell biology, and a graduate level class on biological clocks. He also serves as the director of the Texas A&M's Center for Biological Clocks Research and as faculty for the Texas A&M Institute for Neuroscience and PhD program in genetics. In addition, Hardin was also actively involved in the Society for Research on Biological Rhythms; he served as the secretary in 2006, treasurer in 2010, and president in 2016.

== Research ==
=== Discovery of per mRNA cycling ===
In 1971, Ron Konopka, a geneticist at the California Institute of Technology, discovered the Period gene, which he found to be involved in the circadian clock of Drosophila. In 1999, Paul Hardin discovered that per mRNA underwent strong circadian oscillations by exposing isolated wild-type per mRNA to a series of light-dark (LD) cycles followed by cycles of constant darkness (DD). As a post-doctorate in the lab of chronobiologist Dr. Michael Rosbash, Hardin specifically noted that per mRNA levels in Drosophila brains fluctuate about 10-fold in a typical 24-hour light-dark cycle. Hardin further demonstrated that wild-type protein, PER, can rescue rhythmicity in the mRNA of an arrhythmic mutant of the per gene. His findings suggested that feedback of the PER protein regulates levels of per mRNA. Hardin ultimately published his seminal work on the rhythmic nature of per mRNA in Drosophila in the journal Nature. This discovery led Hardin and other prominent members in the field of chronobiology to develop a model that describes the clock mechanism in Drosophila. This model is referred to as the Transcription Feedback Loop, which suggests that the translated protein provides negative feedback on the mRNA transcription of itself.

=== Role of the E-box in per activation ===
In 1997, Hardin, with Haiping Hao and David Allen, analyzed the sequence of the per gene in Drosophila and found a 69-bp enhancer upstream of the gene. This enhancer sequence contained an E-box (CACGTG), which was determined to be necessary for high-level per transcription. As E-boxes are typically bound by proteins containing a basic helix-loop-helix (bHLH) protein structural motif, the presence of an E-box in per led to the hypothesis that the proteins involved in circadian rhythms may contain a bHLH domain. This proved to be vital in establishing the function of the previously discovered CLOCK protein, which was known to play a role in circadian rhythms and contained a bHLH domain as well. This discovery also aided in the identification of the BMAL1 and CYCLE proteins as critical players in the circadian rhythms of mammalian and Drosophila circadian systems respectively.

=== Circadian rhythms in olfaction ===
While teaching at the University of Houston, Hardin, along with fellow scientists Balaji Krishnan and Stuart Dryer, investigated circadian rhythms of olfaction in Drosophila. Previous experiments had shown that Drosophila antennae demonstrate circadian rhythms. However, the mechanism for circadian rhythms in the antennae was unknown. To determine the mechanism of rhythms in antennae, Hardin and his team kept wild-type and mutant flies, per^{01} and tim^{01}, in 12:12 light-dark (LD) cycles and measured olfaction in the antennae with an electroantennogram (EAG), that measures the average output of an insect antenna to its brain for a given odor, over a 24-hour period. Only the wild-type flies demonstrated rhythmicity in the electrical activity, which indicated that circadian rhythms were present in the olfactory response. In contrast, the mutants showed no cyclic activity. Therefore, Hardin's team discovered that circadian rhythms control the olfactory response in Drosophila antennae and his results were eventually published in Nature.

=== Discovery of two interlocked feedback loops in circadian clock ===
In 1999, Hardin along with Nick Glossop and Lisa Lyons, conducted research on the specific role of Clk in the interlocked feedback loops present in Drosophila circadian oscillators. It was previously known that five genes (per, tim, dbt, Clk, and cyc) controlled circadian rhythms in Drosophila. The per-tim regulation mechanism was known at this time, though Clk regulation was not yet known.

Hardin and his team conducted a series of experiments to identify the two interlocked feedback loops in the circadian mechanism of Drosophila. This means that the per-tim feedback loop connects to the Clk-cyc feedback loop, so that one loop has an effect on the other, and vice versa. They measured wild-type and mutant Clk mRNA levels to identify any changes in transcription levels. They observed that the PER-TIM complex suppresses transcription. They hypothesized that the Clk repressor was either the CLK-CYC complex itself or a repressor that was activated by CLK-CYC. They observed that the presence of active CLK and CYC resulted in the repression of Clk, while arrhythmic per mutants exhibited low levels of Clk. This evidence led them to propose the following model regarding two interlocked feedback loops:

1. Late at night, PER-TIM dimers in the nucleus bind to and sequester CLK-CYC dimers. This interaction effectively inhibits CLK-CYC function, which leads to the repression of per and tim transcription and the de-repression of Clk transcription.
2. As PER-TIM levels fall early in the morning, CLK-CYC dimers are released and repress Clk expression, thereby decreasing Clk mRNA levels by the end of the day.
3. Concomitant with the drop in Clk mRNA levels (through CLK-CYC–dependent repression) is the accumulation of per and tim mRNA (through E-box–dependent CLK-CYC activation).
4. The levels of CLK-CYC fall in the early evening, leading to a decrease in per and tim transcription and an increase in Clk mRNA transcription.
5. A new cycle then begins as high levels of PER and TIM enter the nucleus and CLK starts to accumulate late at night.

In 2003, Hardin's team uncovered the second feedback loop associated with the circadian clock. vrille (vri) and Par Domain Protein 1 (Pdp1) encode related transcription factors whose expression is directly activated by dCLOCK/CYCLE. They show that VRI and PDP1 proteins feed back and directly regulate dClock expression. Thus, VRI and PDP1, together with dClock itself, comprise a second feedback loop in the Drosophila clock that gives rhythmic expression of dClock, and probably of other genes, to generate accurate circadian rhythms.

=== Summary of major research contributions ===
- 1990: PER protein regulates rhythmic cycling in per mRNA of Drosophila.
- 1992: PER protein regulation of per mRNA occurs at the transcriptional level.
- 1994: Circadian oscillations occur and behave differently in different body tissues such as the head, thorax, and abdomen in Drosophila.
- 1997: E-boxes, and particularly bHLH domains, are essential for per activation.
- 1997: A 69 base-pair sequence of per gene contributes to circadian rhythms in gene expression.
- 1999: Two interlocked negative feedback loops, PER-TIM loop and a CLK-CYC loop, regulate the circadian oscillator in Drosophila.
- 1999: The olfactory response in Drosophila is rhythmic.
- 2000: PAR domain is an output of circadian rhythms in Drosophila.
- 2001: Circadian photoreceptor cryptochrome (cry) has a light-independent role in circadian oscillations under some circumstances.

=== Current research ===
Hardin's current research centers on the function of the circadian clock in Drosophila melanogaster. One of Hardin's main research topics is understanding the mechanism behind the circadian rhythms in olfaction and gustatory physiology. His research also focuses on understanding the role of post-translational regulatory mechanisms in the feedback loop that set a 24-hour rhythm. Lastly, his lab has been working on identifying if the interlocked loops in the feedback mechanism function as a circadian oscillator or a clock output. His most recent article discusses the conservation of the transcription feedback loop in not only Drosophila, but also in other animal species as well.

== Honors and awards ==
- John W. Lyons Jr. '59 Endowed Chair in Biology (2005)
- John and Rebecca Moores Professorship at the University of Houston (2004)
- Aschoff Honma Prize (2003)
