= Michael W. Young =

American biologist and geneticist (born 1949)

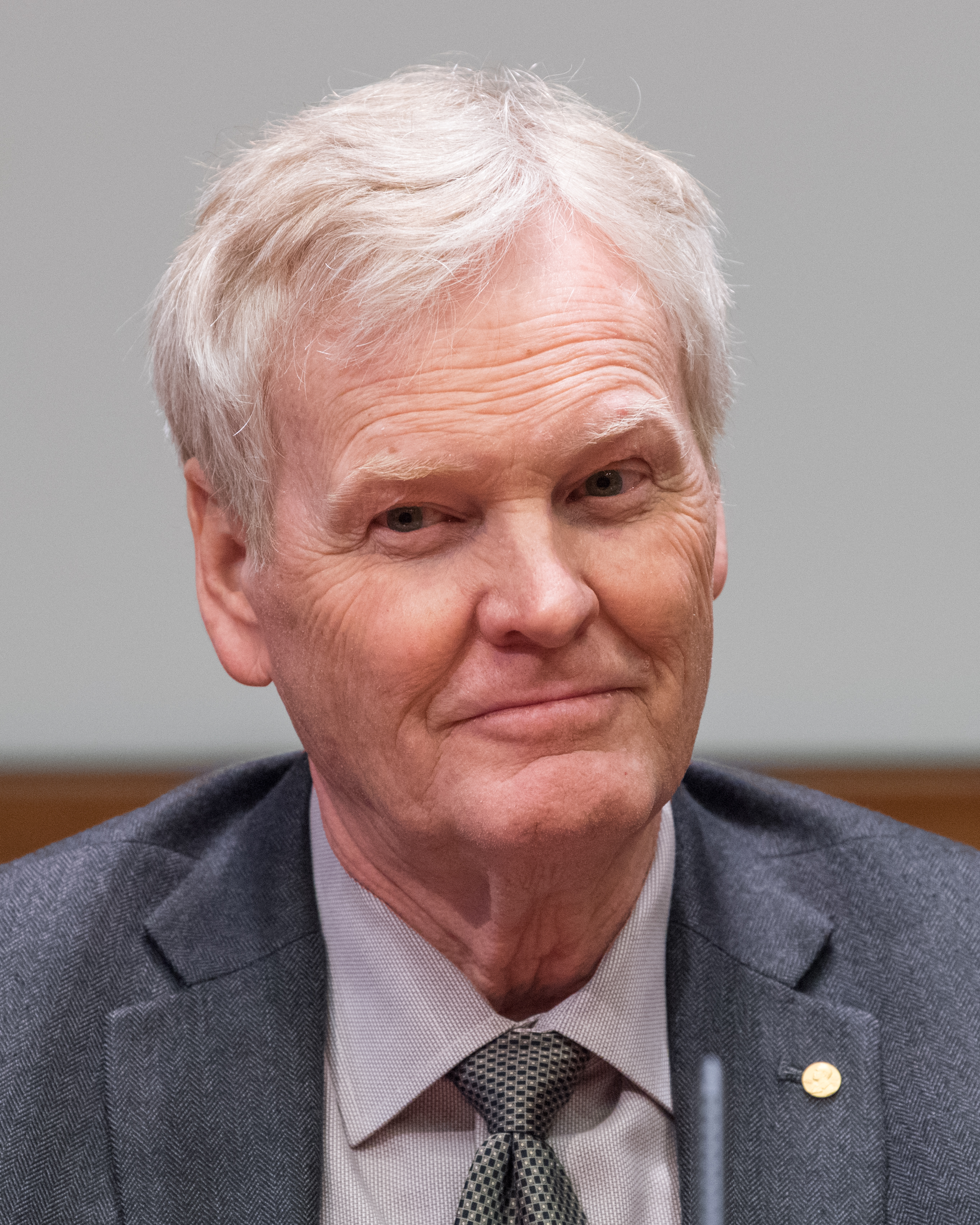
- Michael W. Young in Nobel Prize press conference in Stockholm, December 2017
- Born: Michael Warren Young; March 28, 1949 (age 77); Miami, Florida, U.S.
- Education: University of Texas, Austin (BA, PhD)
- Known for: Circadian rhythms
- Awards: Nobel Prize in Physiology or Medicine 2017; Wiley Prize in Biomedical Sciences 2013; Shaw Prize 2013; Canada Gairdner International Award 2012; Massry Prize 2012; Louisa Gross Horwitz Prize 2011; Gruber Prize in Neuroscience 2009
- Scientific career
- Fields: Chronobiology; Biology
- Workplaces: University of Texas, Austin; Stanford University School of Medicine; Rockefeller University
- Thesis: Non-essential sequences, genes, and the polytene chromosome bands of drosophila melanogaster (1975)
- Doctoral advisor: Burke Judd
- Doctoral students: Leslie B. Vosshall

Michael Warren Young (born March 28, 1949) is an American biologist and geneticist. He has dedicated decades to research studying genetically controlled patterns of sleep and wakefulness within Drosophila melanogaster.

At Rockefeller University, his lab has made significant contributions in the field of chronobiology by identifying key genes associated with regulation of the internal clock responsible for circadian rhythms. He was able to elucidate the function of the period gene, which is necessary for the fly to exhibit normal sleep cycles. Young's lab is also attributed with the discovery of the timeless and doubletime genes, which makes proteins that are also necessary for circadian rhythm. He was awarded the 2017 Nobel Prize in Physiology or Medicine along with Jeffrey C. Hall and Michael Rosbash "for their discoveries of molecular mechanisms controlling the circadian rhythm".

== Life ==
=== Early life ===
Michael W. Young was born in Miami, Florida, on March 28, 1949. His father worked for Olin Mathieson Chemical Corporation managing aluminum ingot sales for the south eastern United States. His mother worked for a law firm as a secretary. Despite no history of science or medicine in either of their backgrounds, Young's parents were supportive of his interest in science and provided the means of scientific exploration through microscopes and telescopes. They lived in an environment close to private zoos, where occasionally some of the animals would escape into their backyard and spark Young's scientific interest.

Michael Young grew up in and around Miami, Florida. Then, his family moved near Dallas, Texas, where he graduated from L. D. Bell High School. In his early teens, Michael's parents gifted him one of Darwin's books on evolution and biological mysteries. The book described biological clocks as the reason why a strange plant he had seen years earlier produced flowers that closed during the day and opened at night. The location and composition of these clocks were unknown, and this sparked Michael Young's interest at an early age.

=== Family life ===
While working as a graduate student at the University of Texas at Austin, Michael Young met his future wife Laurel Eckhardt. Later, both moved to Stanford University, where Michael worked as a postdoctoral fellow and Laurel pursued her PhD with Len Herzenberg. Today, she is a Professor of Biology at Hunter College. Michael and Laurel still work close to each other. Together, they have two daughters, Natalie and Arissa.

== Academic career ==
Young earned his undergraduate degree in biology from University of Texas at Austin in 1971. After a summer of research with Burke Judd on the Drosophila genome, Young stayed at the UT to complete a Ph.D. in genetics in 1975. It was during his time here that Young became fascinated with research focused on Drosophila. During his graduate work, he learned of Ron Konopka and Seymour Benzer's work with Drosophila circadian mutants, which led to his future work in cloning the period gene.

Michael Young continued his studies through postdoctoral training at Stanford University School of Medicine with an interest in molecular genetics and particular focus on transposable elements. He worked in Dave Hogness' lab and became familiar with the methods of recombinant DNA. Two years later, he joined Rockefeller University as an assistant professor. From 1978 on he was involved in the University, serving as associate professor in 1984 and later named professor in 1988. In 2004, Young was appointed Vice President for Academic Affairs and was also granted the Richard and Jeanne Fisher Chair.

== Scientific career ==
=== Discovery of PER ===
At The Rockefeller University in the early 1980s, Young and his two lab members, Ted Bargiello and Rob Jackson, further investigated the circadian period gene in Drosophila. They constructed segments of recombinant Drosophila DNA, amplified them in bacteria, and injected them in per mutant animals. A locomotor behavior monitor was used to assay behavioral activity. The team watched and recorded fly activity through the day and night to show that the fly restored circadian behavioral rhythms by transferring a functional per gene. Later, by determining the sequence of the gene on the X chromosome, they found that the arrhythmic mutation produced a functionless protein, while long-period and short-period mutants of per changed the amino acid sequence of a still functional protein.

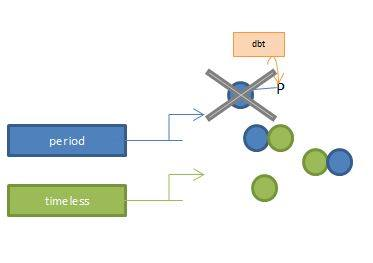
Period and Timeless proteins bind together to form a stabilized dimer, which allows the two to enter the nucleus. Phosphorylation of period by double-time initiates degradation.

=== Discovery of timeless ===
Following the discovery of per, the Young lab looked for additional circadian genes. In late 1980s, Amita Sehgal, Jeff Price, Bernice Man helped Young use forward genetics to screen for additional mutations that altered fly rhythms. A new gene located on chromosome 2 was named timeless (tim) and was successfully cloned and sequenced. They found strong functional connections between tim and per. Tim mutants interfered with per mRNA cycling. In 1994, Leslie Vosshall, a graduate student in Young's lab, discovered that if PER proteins were protected from degradation, they would accumulate without TIM, but could not move to the nuclei. Later Young and others found that TIM proteins did not accumulate in nuclei in per mutants. They concluded that PER and TIM worked together. Another lab member Lino Saez, saw that PER and TIM associate with each other to stabilize each other and to allow their nuclear accumulation. Later studies by the Young, Sehgal, and Edery labs revealed that light causes the rapid degradation of TIM and resets of the phase of the circadian rhythm.

=== Doubletime phosphorylation ===
In 1998, Jeff Price from the Young lab discovered a kinase called doubletime (Casein kinase 1) that phosphorylates PER on certain serine residues. This signal marks it for degradation. When PER and TIM are bound, doubletime does not seem to be able to phosphorylate PER, allowing it to accumulate. Young's discovery of doubletime mutants in 1998 was soon followed by the 2001 discovery of a form of Familial Advanced Sleep Phase Syndrome (FASPS) in humans, which is linked to an hPer2 polymorphism that removes a serine normally phosphorylated by Casein kinase 1. Other forms of FASPS are caused by mutations that alter the Casein kinase 1 gene. Doubletime mutations in Drosophila alter the phosphorylation and degradation of PER protein. This affects the regularity in period of the organism. This discovery solidified doubletime as a necessary part of the circadian clock.

== Positions and honors ==
- 1978: Andre and Bella Meyer Foundation fellowship
- 2006: Pittendrigh/Aschoff Award from the Society for Research on Biological Rhythms
- 2007: Fellow of the American Academy of Microbiology
- 2007: Member of the National Academy of Sciences
- 2009: Gruber Prize in Neuroscience (with Michael Rosbash and Jeffrey C. Hall)
- 2011: Louisa Gross Horwitz Prize (Columbia University) (with Michael Rosbash and Jeffrey C. Hall)
- 2012: Massry Prize (with Michael Rosbash and Jeffrey C. Hall)
- 2012: Canada Gairdner International Award (with Michael Rosbash and Jeffrey C. Hall)
- 2013: Shaw Prize in Life Science and Medicine (with Michael Rosbash and Jeffrey C. Hall)
- 2013: Wiley Prize in Biomedical Sciences (with Michael Rosbash and Jeffrey C. Hall)
- 2017: Nobel Prize in Physiology or Medicine (with Michael Rosbash and Jeffrey C. Hall)
- 2018: Member of the American Philosophical Society
