= Charles Weitz =

US chronobiologist and neurobiologist

Charles J. Weitz
- Education: Harvard University (BA); Stanford University School of Medicine (MD, PhD); Johns Hopkins School of Medicine (Post-Doc)
- Known for: Circadian rhythms
- Scientific career
- Fields: Chronobiology; Neurobiology; Molecular Biology
- Workplaces: Harvard Medical School

Charles J. Weitz is a chronobiologist and neurobiologist whose work primarily focuses on studying the molecular biology and genetics of circadian clocks.

At Harvard University, the Weitz lab consolidated understanding towards the transcriptional architecture of the circadian clock in Drosophila and mice models. He determined the role of the CLOCK protein, which serves to activate transcription of circadian clock genes. The Weitz lab is also accredited for discovering direct transcription termination by the PER complex, which regulates the expression of genes involved in producing the circadian rhythm.

Currently, Weitz's work focuses on using cryo-electron microscopy to study endogenous circadian protein complexes.

== Education and academic career ==
=== Education ===
Charles J. Weitz earned his undergraduate degree in Philosophy from Harvard University in 1978.

He received his medical degree from the Stanford University School of Medicine in 1983. After medical school, he completed his internship in surgery/neurosurgery in 1984 at Stanford University School of Medicine. After pursuing medicine, Weitz decided to focus more on research and obtained a Ph.D. in Neuroscience from Stanford University School of Medicine in 1988. He completed his postdoctoral research under the guidance of Dr. Jeremy Nathans from 1988 to 1993 in Molecular Biology and Genetics at Johns Hopkins School of Medicine where his work focused on photoreception, investigating the genetic and molecular basis for human tritanopia.

=== Academic career ===
Weitz went into teaching and currently holds the position of Robert Henry Pfeiffer Professor of Neurobiology, where he teaches graduate-level courses, including the Molecular Biology of Mammalian Circadian Clocks.

== Scientific career ==
=== Role of CLOCK in feedback regulation ===
In 1998, Weitz was one of many who helped contribute to the discovery of the role of CLOCK in feedback regulation occurring in the Drosophila model. The genes period (per) and timeless (tim) are two important genes involved in the biological clock of Drosophila. The mRNA expression of both genes occurs in circadian rhythms with approximately 24 hour periods.

Weitz and colleagues first identified dCLOCK, the Drosophila homolog of the mouse CLOCK protein. After this step, they were able to determine the protein product of dCLOCK could activate per and tim transcription. Through an E-box located on the promoters of per and tim, the proteins dCLOCK and BMAL1 are able to induce the expression of per and tim. Eventually, the protein products PERIOD and TIMELESS accumulate inside the nucleus. It is there where they inhibit the transcription activity of CLOCK at their promoters, thus forming a negative feedback loop.

Weitz also was among some of the scientists who helped to discover the role of the CLOCK protein in the mammalian circadian mechanism. Previously, the specific mechanism of how CLOCK controls and influences circadian rhythms was unknown. The research of circadian mechanisms in mammals indicated that CLOCK-BMAL1 heterodimers serve to activate the transcription of circadian clock genes such as mper1. Specifically, the heterodimers bind to E-box elements to activate transcription. A mutant CLOCK was still able to form heterodimers with BMAL1 and able to bind DNA. However, the mutation prevented activation of transcription, which indicates that CLOCK is important for the transcriptional activation of genes such as per which play a role in circadian rhythms.

=== Role of CRY1 and CRY2 in circadian regulation ===
In Drosophila, CRY functions as a circadian photoreceptor by binding to TIM and inhibiting the PER-TIM negative feedback loop in response to light. However, genetic evidence has suggested that CRY may have a different role in mammals. Weitz, Griffin Jr., and Staknis investigated this hypothesis in 1999 and discovered that the two CRY homologs, CRY1 and CRY2, negatively regulate Per1 transcription by inhibiting the CLOCK-BMAL1 complex, independent of light. The regulation of Per1 is crucial for maintaining the rhythms of various physiological processes in organisms. This finding distinguishes the role of mammalian CRYs from Drosophila CRYs, which suggests that Drosophila CRYs serve as ancestral photoreceptors that act as light-dependent regulators of the circadian feedback loop, while mammalian CRYs have retained their role within the circadian feedback loop but have lost their direct photoreceptor function.

The results of Weitz and his colleagues have allowed for further investigations into the molecular mechanisms of circadian clocks. In a 2001 study by various researchers, altered behavioral rhythms and clock gene expression were observed in mice whose Period1 (Per1) gene was inactivated. This results of Weitz’s study allowed them to conclude Per1 plays an important role in peripheral and output pathways of the circadian clock. Another example is a 2000 study conducted by researchers at Medical College of Wisconsin. Using the conclusions made by Weitz’s 1999 paper, the researchers were able to use the information that changes in the level of Period2 are expected to alter levels of other clock genes, affecting the clock’s phase.

=== Discovery of feedback regulation by the PERIOD complex ===
Circadian rhythms are regulated by a transcription-translation feedback loop (TTFL). In mammals, this process is crucially associated with the PER complex, formed by the combined complex of three PER and two CRY proteins. As the PER complex inhibits the expression of PER and CRY, the accumulation and degradation of the PER complex creates a negative feedback loop that helps to regulate the expression of genes involved in producing the circadian rhythm.

In 2012, Weitz, with his two lab members Kiran Padmanabhan and Maria S. Robles, investigated the feedback regulation by the PER complex. In the mouse model, they found that the PER complex contains a helicase that promotes transcriptional termination, SETX. During the negative feedback loop, RNA polymerase II accumulates near termination sites on PER and CRY genes, promoting transcription of the genes. As the PER complex is produced, the SETX interacts with the accumulated RNA polymerase II, blocking its release and inhibiting further transcription of the PER and CRY genes. This discovery solidified insight into how PER proteins may repress clock-controlled target genes directly, contributing to future studies of the circadian clock's transcriptional architecture.

=== Application of cryo-electron microscopy towards understanding the mammalian circadian clock ===
Cryo-electron microscopy (cryo-EM) is a cutting-edge technique that determines the three-dimensional structure of large molecules at high resolution. As it reveals the structures of biomolecules previously difficult to study using traditional methods (see X-ray crystallography and nuclear magnetic resonance spectroscopy), cryo-EM is useful for gaining new insights into the structures and functions of biomolecules.

In 2017, Weitz, alongside Rajindra Aryal, Pieter Bas Kwak, Alfred Tamayo and Michael Gebert, applied this technique to enrich the understanding of the mammalian circadian clock. They deciphered macromolecular compositions of the circadian feedback loop, as well as internal structural properties of the clock’s function. It was discovered that the PER complexes exhibited quasi-spherical structures, featuring globular domains that were connected by flexible linkers. In the cytoplasm, GAPVD1, a cytoplasmic trafficking factor, regulates a system of complexes involved in producing a circadian rhythm.

=== Circadian gene expression in the heart and liver ===
In 2002, Weitz contributed to the research on how circadian gene regulation works in peripheral tissues. The results of the study showed that the circadian phases of the genes in the liver and heart were different from each other. However, the circadian genes in these two tissues affect overlapping biological processes, as indicated by a comparative analysis done by the researchers.

In a 2008 paper, Katja A. Lamia, Kai-Florian Storch along with Charles Weitz discovered that a liver specific mutation to the Bmal1 gene results in low glucose levels during the fasting period of the mices’ feeding cycle. It was also discovered that there was excess glucose usage and loss of rhythmicity in the glucose regulation genes of the liver. This led to the understanding that the liver clock is important for glucose circulation and for rhythmicity of glucose export and ingestion.

== Selected papers ==
- Duong HA, Robles MS, Knutti K, Weitz CJ. A molecular mechanism for circadian clock negative feedback. Science 332, 1436-1439 (2011)
- Padmanabhan K, Robles MS, Westerling T, Weitz CJ. Feedback regulation of transcriptional termination by the mammalian circadian clock PERIOD complex. Science 337, 599-602 (2012)
- Kim JY, Kwak PB, Weitz CJ. Specificity in circadian clock feedback from targeted reconstitution of the NuRD co-repressor. Mol. Cell 56, 738-748 (2014)
- Aryal RA, Kwak PB, Tamayo AG, Chiu PL, Walz T, Weitz CJ. Macromolecular assemblies of the mammalian circadian clock. Mol. Cell (2017, in press)

== Positions and honors ==
- Robert Henry Pfeiffer Professor of Neurobiology at Harvard Medical School
- Junior Faculty Grant from the Giovanni Armenise Harvard Foundation (1998)
