= Vrille (gene) =

Transcriptional gene found in Drosophila melanogaster

Identifiers
- Organism: Drosophila melanogaster
- Symbol: vri
- UniProt: O18660
Search for
- Structures: Swiss-model
- Domains: InterPro

Vrille (vri) is a bZIP transcription factor found on chromosome 2 in Drosophila melanogaster. Vrille mRNA and protein product (VRI) oscillate predictably on a 24-hour timescale and interact with other circadian clock genes to regulate circadian rhythms in Drosophila. It is also a regulator in embryogenesis; it is expressed in multiple cell types during multiple stages in development, coordinating embryonic dorsal/ventral polarity, wing-vein differentiation, and ensuring tracheal integrity. It is also active in the embryonic gut but the precise function there is unknown. Mutations in vri alter circadian period and cause circadian arrhythmicity and developmental defects in Drosophila.

== Discovery ==
Helene George and Regine Terracol discovered the first vrille alleles (vri^{1} and vri^{2}) in 1997 by EMS-mutagenesis assay and found their products to be transcription factors involved in embryogenesis. Justin Blau elucidated additional "vrille" implications in 1999 while screening for clock-controlled genes in Drosophila heads that responded to PER/TIM heterodimers.

== Function ==
=== Circadian ===
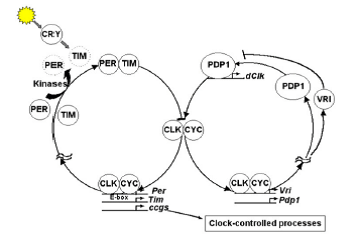
Interlocked molecular feedback loops in Drosophila melanogaster. CLOCK/CYCLE heterodimer acts as transcriptional activator (positive element) for period (per) and timeless (tim) genes. The heterodimer of PER/TIM is phosphorylated in the cytoplasm in the presence of specific kinases, and the phosphorylated complex then acts as inhibitor for its own transcription (negative element). The VRI and PDP1 proteins regulate the levels of CLK/CYC complex, which in turn are regulated by CLK/CYC. Thus, CLK/CYC heterodimer appears to be an important component that connects the two loops and is important for sustaining molecular oscillations. The protein Cryptochrome (CRY) has been implicated in the light entrainment pathways of the Drosophila molecular clock.

The current model of the Drosophila circadian oscillator is composed of two interlocking transcription/translation negative feedback loops. One loop consists of per, tim, clk, cyc, and their mRNA and protein products. In this loop, the PER/TIM heterodimer is a repressor for the CLK/CYC complex while the CLK/CYC complex serves as an activator and transcription factor for per and tim. Vrille is activated by the CLK/CYC complex and encodes a repressor of CLK transcription. The second regulatory loop is composed of vri, pdp1, clk, and their mRNA and protein products. Vrille is activated by the CLK/CYC complex and encodes a repressor of CLK transcription. High levels of CLK/CYC activate the transcription of Vrille mRNA to increase protein production, leading to transcriptional repression of clk which ultimately reduces the concentration of CLK/CYC complexes. Lastly, PDP1 protein, a bZIP transcription factor, serves as an activator of clk transcription and peaks 3–6 hours after the VRI protein peak and, together with VRI, regulate daily rhythms in CLK protein.

=== Non-Circadian ===
Vrille acts as an enhancer of decapentaplegic (dpp) and easter, genes critical to the development of dorsal/ventral axis in the process of regional differentiation during Drosophila embryogenesis. Likewise, it can act as an enhancer of dpp mutations. Easter is involved in initiating a protease cascade that activates the dorsal gene, resulting in repression of dpp in the ventral portion of the embryo during early fly development. The mechanism by which vrille affects the dpp pathway is still unknown.

mRNA analysis and bioinformatic analysis have suggested that vrille is involved in the regulatory networks leading to cardiac senescence. In addition, overexpression of vri has led to heart dysfunctions, while a loss of function significantly reduces age-related cardiac dysfunction as a result of oxidative stress reduction

Induction of vri in Drosophila eye precursor cells, the underdeveloped cells that will become cells of the eye, both reduces the number of ommatidia while simultaneously altering their internal structures. Overexpression of vri causes anti-proliferative effects in processes vital for limb generation, as well as abnormal phenotypes in salivary glands and internal organs. Lastly, it has been postulated that vri affects these processes by interacting with genes involved in the production of cytoskeleton although the exact process is still unknown

== Homologs ==
The closest mammalian homolog to vri is the transcriptional regulator E4BP4 (NFIL3). Although the consensus binding site for vri has not yet been determined, its bZIP domain does share >85% homology with the protein sequence of E4BP4, and it does recognize the E4BP4 site. E4BP4 represses promoter activity in per1, per2, and osteoblasts, suggesting its role as a negative regulator complex of mammalian circadian clocks. It transcriptionally activates interleukin-3, and is implicated in apoptotic pathways. No other mammalian homologs have been discovered.

The crustacean Daphnia magna co-opts its vri ortholog for activating the doublesex sex-determination gene, a task accomplished by tra in flies. It recognizes the dsx1 enhancer sequence CGTTATA:ACATTGTTAT.
