= Jeffrey Price =

Jeff(rey) or Geoff(rey) Price may refer to:

- Jeffrey Price (screenwriter), part of the Hollywood screenwriting team
- Jeff Price, head men's basketball coach at Georgia Southern University
- Geoff Price, American football player
- Jeffrey L. Price, chronobiologist
- David Price (mineral physicist) (Geoffrey David Price, born 1956), British mineral physicist
- Jeffrey Price, a fictional store clerk from Men in Black 3
