= Amita Sehgal =

Indian biologist

- Education: Delhi University; Jawaharlal Nehru University; Cornell University
- Scientific career
- Fields: chronobiology
- Workplaces: Perelman School of Medicine
- Academic advisors: Michael Young, Moses Chao

Amita Sehgal is a molecular biologist and chronobiologist in the Department of Neuroscience at the Perelman School of Medicine at the University of Pennsylvania. Sehgal was involved in the discovery of Drosophila TIM and many other important components of the Drosophila clock mechanism. Sehgal also played a pivotal role in the development of Drosophila as a model for the study of sleep. Her research continues to be focused on understanding the genetic basis of sleep and also how circadian systems relate to other aspects of physiology.

== Education and early career ==
Sehgal grew up in India, and earned her BSc as an undergraduate at Delhi University and her MSc at Jawaharlal Nehru University, both in New Delhi, India. She began pursuing her PhD in cell biology and genetics at Cornell University in 1983. It was here, while studying a human neuronal growth factor, that her interest in science truly developed. In 1988, she began her Postdoctoral Fellowship at Rockefeller University in the lab of Michael Young, where she had her first exposure to the study of circadian rhythms, a field in which she has since remained.

== Research ==
=== Timeline of selected major research contributions ===
- 1994: Discovered the timeless mutation in fruit flies.
- 1995: Cloned the timeless gene and showed the expression of the timeless gene has daily cycles.
- 1996: Showed pulses of light degrade timeless.
- 2000: Developed a Drosophila model for sleep.
- 2001: Showed neurofibromin 1 plays a role in the circadian pathway in fruit flies.
- 2006: Discovered the jetlag mutation and showed the JETLAG protein is involved in the degradation of the TIMELESS protein.
- 2006: Showed mushroom bodies in fruit flies are important for sleep.
- 2008: Discovered the sleepless gene in fruit flies.
- 2014: Mapped neural circuits that link the clock to behavior
- 2014: Discovered a function of sleep in early life
- 2018: Identified a potential role of sleep in adult flies
- 2018: Demonstrated circadian regulation of the blood brain barrier
- 2019: Discovered a molecular link between sleep and the immune system

=== Timeless and Period ===
Amita Sehgal has contributed tremendously towards the understanding of the biological clock of Drosophila melanogaster. In 1994, Sehgal, Price, Man, and Young, through forward genetics, discovered a mutant of the gene timeless (TIM) in Drosophila melanogaster. In the following year, Sehgal and colleagues cloned TIM through positional cloning and were able to show that TIM and PER had similar cycling levels of their mRNA. The model they proposed, which was confirmed over time, was that PER and TIM interact and accumulate during the day. In the evening, they enter the nucleus to inhibit the transcription of their mRNA. In 1996, Sehgal's laboratory showed that degradation in TIM levels caused by a pulse of light resets the circadian clock. Later, they showed that specific phosphatases control stability of PER and TIM in daily cycles.

=== Neurofibromin 1 ===
Neurofibromin 1 (NF1) is a tumor suppressor gene known to be dis-regulated in Neurofibromatosis type 1, a disorder which causes tumors along the spine. In 2001, Sehgal and her colleagues learned that some patients with Neurofibromatosis type 1 also experience irregularities in their sleep, and so decided to investigate the circadian rhythms of flies with a nonfunctional NF1 gene. They found that these flies also have disrupted circadian rhythms, and these rhythms could be restored by inserting NF1 transgenes, thus proving that NF1 is involved in the circadian pathway. They showed that in flies, NF1 functions through the MAP kinase pathway, which is the same pathway implicated in Neurofibromatosis type 1 in humans.

=== Jetlag ===
In 2006, Sehgal and her colleagues discovered a mutant fly which takes an abnormally long time to adjust to new light-dark cycles. They named the underlying mutated gene jetlag (jet). This gene codes for an F-box protein called JET, a ubiquitin ligase that facilitates resetting the drosophila clock. Sequencing of the gene revealed two alleles of jetlag: the "c" allele (common) and the "r" allele (rare). In the presence of CRYPTOCHROME (CRY), JET plays a major role in the degradation of TIMELESS (TIM) protein in response to light, which is necessary for the clock to entrain to external light cues.

=== Mushroom bodies ===
Mushroom bodies are located in the brains of Drosophila and are known to play a role in learning, memory, olfaction, and locomotion. In 2006, Sehgal and her colleagues discovered that mushroom bodies also play a major role in regulating sleep in flies. By using a steroid called RU-486 (Mifepristone) to regulate protein kinase A (PKA), they were able to upregulate and downregulate the expression of genes in specific areas like the mushroom bodies, and found that this structure is critical for fly sleep. While the specific pathway through which these mushroom bodies regulate sleep is currently unknown, it may be that they are involved in inhibiting processing of sensory information, allowing flies to fall asleep.

=== Sleepless ===
In 2008, Sehgal et al. discovered the sleepless gene in fruit flies through insertional mutagenesis. Mutations in the sleepless gene caused the flies to sleep 80% less than normal flies, and live half as long as normal flies. Sehgal et al. discovered that the SLEEPLESS protein regulates the voltage-gated potassium channel, Shaker, and also nicotinic acetylcholine receptors, specifically one called redeye that they discovered through another genetic screen. Sehgal et al. also found increased stem cell activity within the testes of male flies with mutations in sleepless.

=== Functions of sleep ===
All species, including humans, sleep a lot in early life. Sehgal et al discovered what keeps sleep at high levels in young fruit flies. They also found that when sleep is disrupted in early life, mating behavior is perturbed in adults. Thus, sleep may be required to allow brain development for behaviors that promote survival and species propagation. In adult animals, a possible function of sleep is to promote clearance of waste. Sehgal et al found that sleep promotes endocytosis through the blood brain barrier in flies.

=== Clocks and behavior and the blood brain barrier ===
The blood brain barrier (BBB) protects the brain from potentially harmful molecules in the periphery, but it can also impede the delivery of drugs to the central nervous system. Sehgal et al found that permeability of the fly BBB changes over the course of the day: night cycle, so an anti-epileptic works better at a specific time of day. They have also mapped circuits that link the clock to behavioral activity.

=== Sleep and immune function ===
Seeking to identify molecules that induce sleep, Toda et al conducted a genetic screen of >10,000 of fruit fly strains, and found one that drives sleep. This molecule, which they named nemuri, is an anti-microbial peptide. Its expression is switched on by infection or sleep deprivation, and it promotes survival by killing bacteria and increasing sleep.

== Awards and positions ==
=== Positions ===
- Director, Chronobiology and Sleep Institute (CSI), Perelman School of Medicine, University of Pennsylvania, 2019-present
- Director of Penn Chronobiology Program, 2014-19
- Howard Hughes Medical Institute Investigator, 1997 – present
- John Herr Musser Professor of Neuroscience, Perelman School of Medicine, University of Pennsylvania
- Vice Chair of the Department of Neuroscience
- Co-Director of the Penn Medicine Neuroscience Center, 2008-2014

=== Awards ===
- Outstanding Scientific Achievement Award, Sleep Research Society
- Michael S. Brown Junior Faculty Research Award
- Stanley Cohen Senior Faculty Research Award
- Elected to the National Academy of Medicine (formerly Institute of Medicine), 2009
- Elected to the American Academy of Arts and Sciences, 2011
- Elected Fellow of the American Association for the Advancement of Science, 2016
- Elected to the National Academy of Sciences, 2016
- Switzer Prize from the David Geffen School of Medicine at UCLA, 2020
