= Casein kinase =

Enzymes related to biochemistry

Casein kinase, a type of kinase enzyme, may refer to:

- Casein kinase 1, serine/threonine-selective protein kinase family
- Casein kinase 2, a serine/threonine-selective protein kinase
