= Doubletime (gene) =

Protein-coding gene in Drosophila melanogaster

doubletime

Identifiers
- Organism: D. melanogaster
- Symbol: dbt
- Alt. symbols: dco
- Entrez: 43673
- RefSeq (mRNA): NM_001276203.1
- RefSeq (Prot): NP_001263132.1
- UniProt: O76324

Other data
- EC number: 2.7.11.1
- Chromosome: 3R: 26.88 - 26.89 Mb
Search for
- Structures: Swiss-model
- Domains: InterPro

Doubletime (DBT), also known as discs overgrown (DCO), is a gene that encodes the doubletime protein in fruit flies (Drosophila melanogaster). Michael Young and his team at Rockefeller University first identified and characterized the gene in 1998.

The DBT-encoded protein is a kinase that phosphorylates the period (PER) protein, which is crucial in controlling the biological clock that regulates circadian rhythms. Various mutations in the DBT gene have been observed to cause alterations in the period of locomotor activity in flies, including lengthening, shortening, or complete loss of the period in flies. In mammals, the homolog of DBT is casein kinase I epsilon, which has a similar role in regulating the circadian rhythm.

The circadian function of Drosophila and certain vertebrate Casein kinase 1 enzymes has been conserved over a long evolutionary timescale, making DBT and its homologs essential targets for research into the molecular mechanisms that underlie circadian rhythm regulation in various organisms.

== Discovery ==
The doubletime gene (DBT) was first discovered and characterized in 1998 by Michael Young and his team at Rockefeller University. Young's research group, headed by Jeffrey Price, published their findings in a paper which characterized three alleles of DBT in fruit flies. It was reported that two mutant alleles, named short and long (DBT^{s} and DBT^{l}, respectively), were able to disrupt the normal cycling of the genes Period (per) and Timeless (TIM).

The team suspected that the delay between the rise in mRNA levels of per and TIM and the rise of PER and TIM protein was due to the effects of another protein.

Young suspected that this protein postponed the intercellular accumulation of PER protein by destroying it. Only when PER was paired with TIM was this breakdown not possible. This work showed that DBT regulated the break-down of PER.

Young named the novel gene "doubletime" due to its effect on the normal period of Drosophila. Mutant flies that only expressed DBT^{S} had an 18-hour period, while those expressing DBT^{L} had a 28-hour period. Young's team also identified a third allele, DBT^{P}, which is lethal to pupae while ablating any per or TIM products in larvae. DBT^{P} mutants are important because they provided clues as to how the gene product functioned.

Without functional DBT protein, flies accumulate high levels of PER. These PER proteins do not disintegrate without pairing with TIM proteins. These mutants expressed higher cytosolic levels of PER than cells in which PER protein was associated with TIM protein. The doubletime gene regulates the expression of PER, which in turn controls circadian rhythm. Young's team later cloned the DBT gene and found that the DBT protein was a kinase that specifically phosphorylated PER proteins; they concluded that PER proteins were not phosphorylated by DBT protein in DBT^{P} mutants.

== Gene ==
The gene is located on the right arm of chromosome 3. The mRNA transcript for DBT is 3.2 kilobase pairs long and contains four exons and three introns.

== Protein ==
The DBT protein is composed of 440 amino acids. The protein has an ATP binding site, serine/threonine kinase catalytic domains, and several potential phosphorylation sites, including a site for autophosphorylation.

== Function ==
=== Regulation of circadian rhythm ===
In Drosophila, a molecularly-driven clock mechanism works to regulate circadian rhythms such as locomotor activity and eclosion by oscillating the levels of the proteins PER and TIM via positive and negative feedback loops. Dbt produces a kinase that phosphorylates PER to regulate its accumulation in the cytoplasm and its degradation in the nucleus. In the cytoplasm, PER and TIM levels rise during the night, and DBT binds to PER while levels of TIM are still low. DBT phosphorylates the cytoplasmic PER, which leads to its degradation. When TIM accumulates, PER and TIM bind, which inhibits the degradation of PER. This cytoplasmic PER degradation, followed by accumulation, causes a four to six hour delay between the levels of per mRNA and PER protein. The PER/TIM complex, still bound to DBT, migrates into the nucleus, where it suppresses the transcription of per and tim. TIM is lost from the complex, following which DBT phosphorylates PER, degrading it. This mechanism allows for the transcription of the CLOCK and the genes it controls (with transcription controlled by circadian mechanisms).

The transcription of DBT mRNA and the levels of the DBT protein are consistent throughout the day and not controlled by PER/TIM levels—however, the location and concentration of the DBT protein within the cell change throughout the day. It is consistently present in the nucleus at varying levels, but in the cytoplasm it is predominantly present in the late day and early night, when PER and TIM levels peak.

Before DBT begins phosphorylating PER, a different protein called NEMO/NLK kinase begins phosphorylating PER at its per-short domain. The phosphorylation stimulates DBT to begin phosphorylating PER at multiple nearby sites. In total, there are about 25-30 phosphorylation sites on PER. The phosphorylated PER binds to the F-box protein SLIMB, and it is then targeted for degradation through the ubiquitin-proteasome pathway; Syed and Saez conclude the phosphorylation of PER by DBT leads to a decrease in PER abundance, which is a necessary step in the function of the organism's internal clock.

The activity of DBT on PER is aided by the activity of the proteins CKII and SHAGGY (SGG), as well as a rhythmically expressed protein phosphatase that acts as an antagonist. It is possible, but currently unknown, if DBT regulates other functions of PER or other circadian proteins. There has been no evidence that suggests that DBT binds directly to TIM. The only kinase known to directly phosphorylate TIM is the SGG kinase protein, but this does not majorly affect TIM stability, suggesting the presence of a different kinase or phosphatase. DBT is involved in recruiting other kinases into PER repression complexes. These kinases phosphorylate the transcription factor CLK, which releases the CLK-CYC complex from the E-Box and represses transcription.

=== Mutant alleles ===
There are three primary mutant alleles of DBT: DBT^{S}, which shortens the organism's free-running period (its internal period in constant light conditions); DBT^{L}, which lengthens the free-running period; and DBT^{P}, which causes pupal lethality and eliminates circadian cycling proteins and the transcription of per and TIM. All mutants except for DBT^{S} produce differential PER degradation that directly corresponds with their phenotypic behavior. DBT^{S} PER degradation resembles wild-type DBT, suggesting that DBT^{S} does not affect the clock through this degradation mechanism. It has been suggested that DBT^{S} works by acting as a repressor or producing a different phosphorylation pattern of the substrate. DBT^{S} causes early termination of per transcription.

The DBT^{L} mutation causes the period of PER and TIM oscillations and animal behavioral activity to lengthen to about 27 hours. This extended rhythm is caused by a decreased rate of phosphorylation of PER due to lower DBT kinase activity levels. This mutation is caused by a substitution in the protein sequence (Met-80→Ile mutation).

The DBT^{S} mutation causes a PER/TIM oscillation period of 18–20 hours. There is no current evidence for the mechanism affected by the mutation, but it is caused by a substitution in the protein sequence (Pro-47→ Ser mutation).

Another DBT mutation is DBT^{AR}, which causes arrhythmic activities in Drosophila. It is a hypermorphic allele resulting from a His 126→Tyr mutation. Homozygous flies with this mutation are viable but arrhythmic, whereas DBT^{AR/+} heterozygotes have extra-long periods of about 29 hours, and their DBT kinase activity is reduced to the lowest rate of all the DBT alleles.

=== Noncircadian roles ===
Clock gene mutations, including those in Drosophila's DBT, alter the sensitization of drug-induced locomotor activity after repeated exposure to psychostimulants. Drosophila with mutant alleles of DBT failed to display locomotor sensitization in response to repeated cocaine exposure. Additionally, there is experimental evidence for this gene to function in 13 unique biological processes: biological regulation, phosphorus metabolic process, the establishment of planar polarity, positive regulation of the biological process, cellular process, single-organism developmental process, response to stimulus, response to an organic substance, sensory organ development, macromolecule modification, growth, cellular component organization or biogenesis, and rhythmic process. The gene's alternative name, discs overgrown, refers to its role as a cell growth-regulating gene that has strong effects on cell survival and growth control in imaginal discs, an attribute of the larvae fly stage. The protein is necessary in the mechanism linking cell survival during proliferation and growth arrest.

=== Noncatalytic role ===
The DBT protein may play a noncatalytic role in attracting kinases that phosphorylate CLOCK (CLK), an activator of transcription. DBT has a noncatalytic role in recruiting kinases, some of which have not yet been discovered, into the transcription-translation feedback loop. DBT's catalytic activity is not associated with the phosphorylation of CLK or its transcriptional repression. PER phosphorylation by DBT is integral to repressing CLK-dependent transcription. The DBT protein is noncatalytic in recruiting additional kinases that indirectly phosphorylate CLK, which downregulates transcription. A similar pathway exists in mammals due to the mechanistic conservation of the CKI homolog. In 2004, Drosophila cells were observed to have reduced CKI-7 activity in DBT^{s} and DBT^{l} mutants.

== Mammalian homologs ==
=== Casein kinase I ===
The casein kinase 1 (CK1) family of kinases comprises a highly-conserved group of proteins found in organisms ranging from Arabidopsis to Drosophila to humans. Since DBT is a member of this family, it has prompted questions regarding the roles of these related genes in other model systems. Within mammals, there are seven CK1 isoforms, each with distinct roles surrounding protein phosphorylation. CK1ε was found to be the most homologous to DBT with a similarity of 86%. This genetic similarity extends to functional homology; for instance, while phosphorylation by DBT in Drosophila targets PER proteins for proteasome degradation, CK1ε phosphorylation marks mammalian PER proteins for degradation by reducing their stability. Although DBT and CK1ε play similar roles in their respective organisms, studies examining the effectiveness of CK1ε in Drosophila have revealed they are not completely functionally interchangeable, though their functions are highly analogous; for example, CK1ε has been shown to reduce the half-life of mPER1, one of the three mammalian PER homologs. The nuclear localization of mPER proteins is associated with phosphorylation, underscoring another vital function of the CK1ε protein.

=== Role of CKIε ===
Initially, the role of CKIε within the circadian clock of mammals was discovered due to a mutation in hamsters. The tau mutation in the Syrian golden hamster was the first to show a heritable abnormality of circadian rhythms in mammals. Hamsters with the mutation exhibit a shorter period than the wild-type. Heterozygotes have a period of about 22 hours, whereas the period of homozygotic mutants is at about 20 hours. Because of previous research investigating the role of DBT in establishing periods, the tau mutation was found to be at the same locus as the CKIε gene. The mutation is similar to the mutations DBT^{S} and DBT^{L}, which both affect the internal period of Drosophila. However, the forces driving these changes in the period seem different. It was found that the point mutation resulting in the tau mutant decreased the activity of the CKIε kinase in vitro. In flies, the DBT^{L} mutation is associated with a decrease in DBT activity and a longer period, which is consistent with another experiment done on hamsters that showed a lengthening of the period caused by CKI inhibition. To investigate this discrepancy, researchers studied the half-life of PER2 in relation to wild-type CKIε, CKIεtau, and CKIε (K38A), which is a kinase-inactive mutant. The results indicated that the tau mutation was actually a gain-of-function mutation that caused the more rapid degradation of the PER proteins.

=== Importance of Rhythmic Phosphorylation ===
CKIε also plays a role in humans concerning Familial Advanced Sleep Phase Syndrome, where individuals exhibit a significantly shorter circadian period compared to the general population. The anomaly does not appear to be due to a mutation in the CKIε protein, but rather in the binding site for phosphorylation on the PER2 protein.

Kinase activity is implicated in the nuclear localization of PER and other genes pivotal to circadian rhythmicity.

There is a proposition that rhythmic phosphorylation could be a fundamental driver of circadian clocks. Traditionally, the transcription-translation negative feedback loop has been recognized as the source of oscillations and rhythms in biological clocks. However, in vitro experiments showcasing the phosphorylation of the cyanobacterial protein KaiC demonstrated that rhythmic oscillations could persist even in the absence of transcription or translation processes.
