= TIMELESS (gene) =

Gene

Identifiers
- Aliases: TIMELESS, TIM, TIM1, hTIM, timeless circadian clock, timeless circadian regulator
- External IDs: OMIM: 603887; MGI: 1321393; GeneCards: TIMELESS
Available structures
PDB	Ortholog search: PDBe RCSB
PDB	List of PDB id codes 4XHT, 4XHU, 4XHW

Gene location (Human)
Chr.	Chromosome 12 (human)
Band	12q13.3	Start	56,416,363 bp
Band	12q13.3	End	56,449,426 bp

Gene location (Mouse)
Chr.	Chromosome 10 (mouse)
Band	10 D3|10 76.49 cM	Start	128,067,934 bp
Band	10 D3|10 76.49 cM	End	128,088,810 bp
RNA expression pattern
Bgee	Human / Mouse (ortholog); Top expressed in: ventricular zone; embryo; ganglionic eminence; gonad; mucosa of transverse colon; testicle; right lobe of liver; appendix; stromal cell of endometrium; islet of Langerhans / Top expressed in: lumbar spinal ganglion; otic vesicle; primary oocyte; otic placode; renal corpuscle; zygote; epiblast; saccule; tail of embryo; primitive streak; More reference expression data
BioGPS	n/a
Gene ontology
Molecular function	protein homodimerization activity; protein binding; protein heterodimerization activity; DNA binding
Cellular component	nucleoplasm; nucleus; nuclear chromosome; replication fork protection complex; site of double-strand break; chromosome
Biological process	cell cycle phase transition; regulation of transcription, DNA-templated; lung development; rhythmic process; negative regulation of transcription by RNA polymerase II; transcription, DNA-templated; cell division; morphogenesis of an epithelium; multicellular organism development; regulation of cell population proliferation; regulation of circadian rhythm; circadian rhythm; cell cycle; detection of abiotic stimulus; negative regulation of transcription, DNA-templated; branching morphogenesis of an epithelial tube; cellular response to DNA damage stimulus; cellular response to hydroxyurea; cellular response to cisplatin; cellular response to bleomycin; positive regulation of double-strand break repair; DNA replication checkpoint signaling; DNA repair; replication fork arrest; replication fork protection; positive regulation of double-strand break repair via homologous recombination; DNA replication
Sources:Amigo / QuickGO
Orthologs
Databases	NCBI: entry; OMA: entry
Species	Human	Mouse
Entrez	8914	21853
Ensembl	ENSG00000111602	ENSMUSG00000039994
UniProt	Q9UNS1	Q9R1X4
RefSeq (mRNA)	NM_003920; NM_001330295	NM_001136082; NM_001164080; NM_001164081; NM_011589
RefSeq (protein)	NP_001317224; NP_003911	NP_001129554; NP_001157552; NP_001157553; NP_035719
Location (UCSC)	Chr 12: 56.42 – 56.45 Mb	Chr 10: 128.07 – 128.09 Mb
PubMed search
- Wikidata
View/Edit Human	View/Edit Mouse

timeless

Identifiers
- Organism: D. melanogaster
- Symbol: tim
- Entrez: 33571
- Orthologs: NCBI: entry; OMA: entry
- RefSeq (mRNA): NM_164542
- RefSeq (Prot): NP_722914
- UniProt: P49021

Other data
- Chromosome: 2L: 3.49 - 3.51 Mb
Search for
- Structures: Swiss-model
- Domains: InterPro

Timeless homolog (hTIM) is a protein encoded by the gene TIMELESS in humans that is homologous to the Timeless (tim) and Timeout (tim2) proteins found in drosophila (fruit flies). The human protein is sometimes referred to as "human Timeless" but is actually more closely related to Timeout. Drosophila Timeless has been studied for its essential role in regulating circadian rhythm. Timeless mRNA and protein oscillate rhythmically with time as part of a transcription-translation negative feedback loop involving the period (per) gene and its protein.

== Structure ==
Timeless, N-terminal

Identifiers
- Symbol: TIMELESS
- Pfam: PF04821
- InterPro: IPR006906
Available protein structures:
- PDB: 5MQI IPR006906 PF04821 (ECOD; PDBsum)
- AlphaFold: IPR006906; PF04821

The length of the coding region of the Drosophila timeless gene is 4029 base pairs, from which a 1398 amino acid protein is transcribed. The gene starts at a consensus cap site upstream of a methionine codon. It contains 11 exons and 10 introns. In various Drosophila species, the timeless protein TIM contains more highly conserved functional domains and amino acid sequence than its counterpart, PER (protein encoded by per). CLD was the least conserved of these regions between D. virilis and D. melanogaster. These conserved parts include: the PER interaction domain, the nuclear localization signal (NLS), cytoplasmic localization domain (CLD), N-terminal end (non-functional), and C-terminal end. TIM is also known to have a basic region, which interacts with the PAS domain of the PER protein, and a central acidic region. There is also a region of unknown function near the N-terminus of the TIM protein that contains a 32 amino acid sequence that, when deleted, causes arrhythmic behavior in the fly. In various species of Drosophila, such as D. virilis and D. melanogaster, the initiating methionine for translation of the timeless gene into TIM is in different places, with the D. virilis start site downstream of the start site in D. melanogaster.

== Function ==
timeout

Identifiers
- Organism: Drosophila melanogaster
- Symbol: tim-2
- Orthologs: OMA: entry
- UniProt: Q8INH7
Search for
- Structures: Swiss-model
- Domains: InterPro

Timeout, C-terminal (PAB)
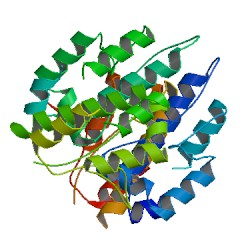
- Human TIMELESS PAB

Identifiers
- Symbol: TIMELESS_C
- Pfam: PF05029
- InterPro: IPR006906
Available protein structures:
- PDB: 4XHT IPR006906 PF05029 (ECOD; PDBsum)
- AlphaFold: IPR006906; PF05029

=== Drosophila ===
The timeless gene is an essential component of the molecular circadian clock in Drosophila. It acts as part of an autoregulatory feedback loop in conjunction with the period (per) gene product as noted in collaborative studies performed by the labs of Michael W. Young and Amita Sehgal. Further studies by the labs of Young, Sehgal, Charles Weitz, and Michael Rosbash indicated that timeless protein (TIM) and period protein (PER) form a heterodimer that exhibits circadian rhythms in wild type Drosophila. Researchers in Rosbash's lab also showed that tim mRNA levels and TIM protein levels have circadian rhythms that are similar to those of the period (per) mRNA and its product. Experiments done jointly by the Weitz, Young, and Sehgal labs using yeast 2-hybrid proved that TIM directly binds with PER. During the early evening, PER and TIM dimerize and accumulate. Late at night, the dimer travels into the nucleus to inhibit per and tim transcription. In 1996, the teams of Sehgal, Edery, and Young found that exposure to light leads to the degradation of TIM and subsequently PER.

The PER/TIM heterodimer negatively regulates transcription of period (per) and timeless (tim) genes. Within this negative feedback loop, first the PER/TIM heterodimers form in the cytoplasm, accumulate, and then translocate to the nucleus. The complex then blocks the positive transcription factors clock (CLK) and cycle (CYC), thereby repressing the transcription of per.

As part of the circadian clock, timeless is essential for entrainment to light-dark (LD) cycles. The typical period length of free-running Drosophila is 23.9 hours, requiring adaptations to the 24-hour environmental cycle. Adaptation first begins with exposure to light. This process leads to the rapid degradation of the TIM protein, allowing organisms to entrain at dawn to environmental cycles.

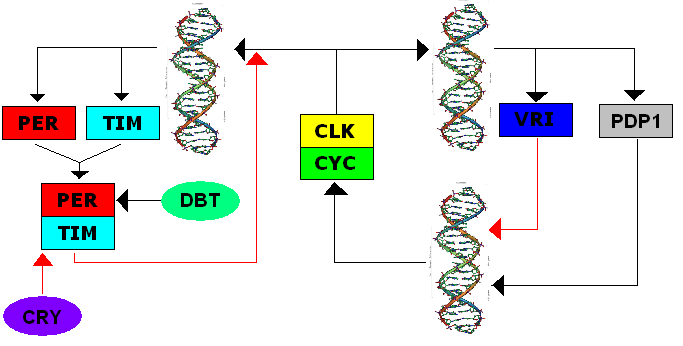
Circadian clock of drosophila

In light-dark cycles, TIM protein level decreases rapidly in late night/early morning, followed by the similar but more gradual changes in PER protein level. TIM degradation is independent of per and its protein, and releases PER from the PER/TIM complex. In some cell types, the photoreceptor protein cryptochrome (CRY) physically associates with TIM and helps regulate light-dependent degradation. CRY is activated by blue light, which binds to TIM and tags it for degradation. This ends the PER/TIM repression of the CLK/CYC-mediated transcription of per and tim genes, allowing per and tim mRNA to be produced to restart the cycle.

This mechanism allows entrainment of flies to environmental light cues. When Drosophila receive light inputs in the early subjective night, light-induced TIM degradation causes a delay in TIM accumulation, which creates a phase delay. When light inputs are received in the late subjective night, a light pulse causes TIM degradation to occur earlier than under normal conditions, leading to a phase advance.

In Drosophila, the negative regulator PER, from the PER/TIM complex, is eventually degraded by a casein kinase-mediated phosphorylation cycle, allowing fluctuations in gene expression according to environmental cues. These proteins mediate the oscillating expression of the transcription factor VRILLE (VRI), which is required for behavioral rhythmicity, per and tim expression, and accumulation of PDF (pigment-dispersing factor).

=== Gryllus bimaculatus ===
Timeless does not appear to be essential for oscillation of the circadian clock for all insects. In wild type Gryllus bimaculatus, tim mRNA shows rhythmic expression in both LD and DD (dark-dark cycles) similar to that of per, peaking during the subjective night. When injected with tim double-stranded RNA (dstim), tim mRNA levels were significantly reduced and its circadian expression rhythm was eliminated. After the dstim treatment, however, adult crickets showed a clear locomotor rhythm in constant darkness, with a free-running period significantly shorter than that of control crickets injected with Discosoma sp. Red2 (DsRed2) dsRNA. These results suggest that in the cricket, tim plays some role in fine-tuning of the free-running period but may not be essential for oscillation of the circadian clock.

=== Mammalian ===
In 1998, researchers identified a mouse homolog and a human homolog of the Drosophila timeless gene. The exact role of TIM in mammals is still unclear,. Recent work on the mammalian timeless (mTim) in mice has suggested that the gene may not play the same essential role in mammals as in Drosophila as a necessary function of the circadian clock. While Tim is expressed in the Suprachiasmatic Nucleus (SCN) which is thought to be the primary oscillator in humans, its transcription does not oscillate rhythmically in constant conditions, and the TIM protein remains in the nucleus.

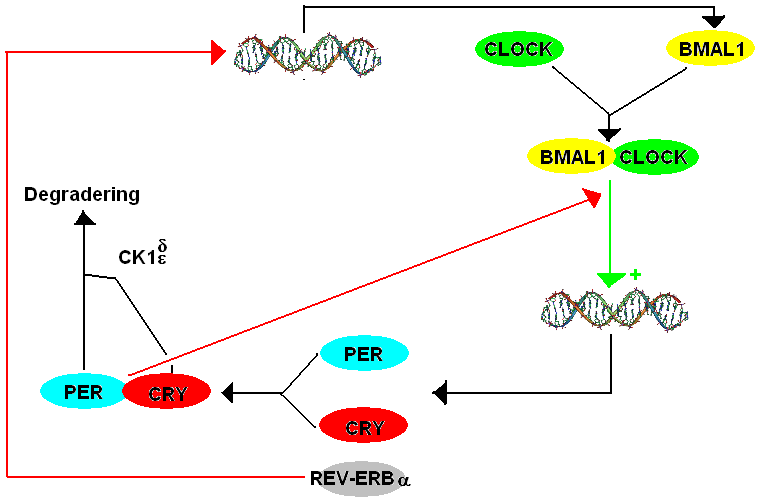
Circadian clock of mammals

However, mTim is shown to be necessary for embryonic development in mice, indicating a different gene function than in Drosophila. This suggests a divergence between mammalian clocks and the Drosophila clock. Moreover, mammalian tim is more orthologous to the Tim-2 (Timeout) paralog of the Drosophila Timeless gene than the actual gene itself. Like tim-2, the mammalian orthologs has a C-terminal PARP1-binding (PAB) domain. The complex they form promotes homologous recombination DNA repair.

The timeless protein is thought to directly connect the cell cycle with the circadian rhythm in mammals. In this model, referred to as a “direct coupling,” the two cycles share a key protein whose expression exhibits a circadian pattern. The essential role of Tim in Drosophila in creating circadian rhythm is accomplished by Cry in mammals. In mammals, Cry and Per transcription is activated by the CLOCK/BMAL1 complex, and repressed by the PER/CRY complex.

==== Human ====
timeless homolog (Human)

Identifiers
- Symbol: TIMELESS
- Alt. symbols: hTIM
- NCBI gene: 8914
- HGNC: 11813
- OMIM: 603887
- RefSeq: NM_003920
- UniProt: Q9UNS1

Other data
- Locus: Chr. 12 q12-q13
Search for
- Structures: Swiss-model
- Domains: InterPro

The human timeless protein (hTIM) has been shown to be required for the production of electrical oscillations output by the suprachiasmatic nucleus (SCN), the major clock governing all tissue-specific circadian rhythms of the body. This protein also interacts with the products of major clock genes CLOCK, BMAL, PER1, PER2 and PER3.

Sancar and colleagues investigated whether hTIM played a similar role to orthologs in C. elegans and types of yeast, which are known to play important roles in the cell cycle. Their experiments suggested that hTIM plays an integral role in the G2/M and intra-S cell cycle checkpoints. With respect to the G2/M checkpoint, hTIM binds to the ATRIP subunit on ATR – a protein kinase sensitive to DNA damage. This binding between hTIM and ATR then leads to the phosphorylation of Chk1, resulting in cell cycle arrest or apoptosis. This process serves as an important control to stop the proliferation of cells with DNA damage prior to mitotic division. The role of hTIM in the intra-S checkpoint is less clear at the molecular level; however, down-regulation of hTIM leads to an increase in the rate of generation of replication forks – even in the presence of DNA damage and other regulatory responses.

== Research ==
The Timeless gene has also been found to influence the development of disease in humans. Downregulation of the timeless gene in human carcinoma cells leads to shortened telomeres, indicating its role in telomere length maintenance. Telomere-associated DNA damage also increases in timeless depleted cells, along with the delay of telomere replication. Swi1 is a timeless-related protein that is required for DNA replication in the telomere region. This association between timeless and telomeres is indicative of the gene's possible association with cancer.

A single nucleotide polymorphism substitution that results in the transformation of glutamine to arginine in the amino acid sequence in the human timeless gene shows no association with either morningness or eveningness tendencies in humans. This is consistent with other research, suggesting that htim is not important in the circadian rhythm of humans.

Timeless is now frequently found to be overexpressed in many different tumor types. In a study that used Timeless-targeting siRNA oligos, followed by a whole-genome expression microarray as well as network analysis. Further testing of Timeless down-regulation on cell proliferation rates of a cervical and breast cancer cell line. It was found that elevated expression of Timeless was significantly associated with more advanced tumor stage and poorer breast cancer prognosis. Similarity in gene expression signatures has allowed for TIMELESS to be identified as Kinase Suppressor of Ras-1 (KSR1)-like and a potential target required for cancer cell survival. TIMELESS overexpression represents a vulnerability in Ras-driven tumors that offers potential insight into novel and selective targets found in Ras-driven cancers, which can be leveraged to develop selective and more effective therapeutics.

== History ==
In 1994, timeless was discovered through forward genetic screening performed by Jeffery L. Price while working in the lab of Michael W. Young. This gene was found when they noticed an arrhythmic tim^{01} mutant via a P element screen. The tim^{01} mutation caused arrhythmic behavior, defined by the lack of ability to establish proper circadian rhythms. In 1995, the timeless gene was cloned by Amita Sehgal and partners in the lab of Michael W. Young. Unlike the Drosophila timeless gene, homologs have been discovered in other species that are non-essential for circadian rhythm. The discovery of timeless followed the discovery of the period mutants in 1971 through forward genetic screening, the cloning of per in 1984, and an experiment determining that per is circadian in 1990. This occurred during a period of rapid expansion in the field of chronobiology in the 1990s.

== See also ==
- Clock gene
- Period gene
- Suprachiasmatic nucleus
- Oscillating gene
- PDF (gene)
