= Cycle (gene) =

Gene regulating Sleep-wake cycle and circadian rhythms

- The approximate 3D structure of CYC protein generated with Phyre^{2}. The protein sequence information was obtained from the UniProt database.

Identifiers
- Organism: Drosophila melanogaster
- Symbol: cyc
- Entrez: 40162
- Orthologs: NCBI: entry; OMA: entry
- RefSeq (mRNA): NM_079444.3
- RefSeq (Prot): NP_524168.2
- UniProt: O61734

Other data
- Chromosome: 3L: 19.81 - 19.81 Mb
Search for
- Structures: Swiss-model
- Domains: InterPro

aryl hydrocarbon receptor nuclear translocator-like

Identifiers
- Symbol: ARNTL
- Alt. symbols: BMAL1
- NCBI gene: 406
- HGNC: 701
- OMIM: 602550
- RefSeq: NP_001025443
- UniProt: O00327

Other data
- Locus: Chr. 11 p15
Search for
- Structures: Swiss-model
- Domains: InterPro

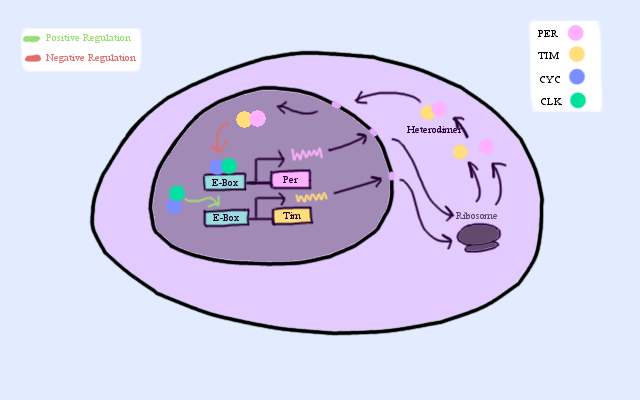
Visual representation of CYC-CLK complex interaction with PER and TIM.

Cycle (cyc) is a gene in Drosophila melanogaster that encodes the CYCLE protein (CYC). The Cycle gene (cyc) is expressed in a variety of cell types in a circadian manner. It is involved in controlling both the sleep-wake cycle and circadian regulation of gene expression by promoting transcription in a negative feedback mechanism. The cyc gene is located on the left arm of chromosome 3 and codes for a transcription factor containing a basic helix–loop–helix (bHLH) domain and a PAS domain. The 2.17 kb cyc gene is divided into 5 coding exons totaling 1,625 base pairs which code for 413 aminos acid residues. Currently 19 alleles are known for cyc . Orthologs performing the same function in other species include basic helix-loop-helix ARNT-like protein 1 (ARNTL) and Aryl hydrocarbon receptor nuclear translocator-like 2 (ARNTL2).

== Function ==
Cycle is primarily known for its role in the genetic transcription-translation feedback loop that generates circadian rhythms in Drosophila. In the cell nucleus, the CYCLE protein (CYC) forms a heterodimer with a second bHLH-PAS protein, CLOCK (CLK). This CYC-CLK protein complex binds to E-box elements in promoter regions of the genes period and timeless, functioning as a transcription factor in the translation of the proteins PER and TIM. After the PER and TIM proteins accumulate in the cytoplasm and bind together, the PER-TIM complex translocates to the nucleus. The TIM protein in these complexes mediate the accumulation of the dimeric PER-TIM protein complex and their subsequent importation into the nucleus, where the PER protein in these complexes then mediates the release of CYC-CLK from the chromatin, repressing CYC-CLK dependent transcription. Thus, CLK and CYC act as positive factors and PER and TIM as negative factors. CYC also plays a role in the post-translational regulation of CLK in the cytoplasm. These four proteins of the feedback loop are later degraded by a casein kinase-mediated phosphorylation cycle, allowing fluctuations in gene expression according to environmental cues. This cycle is called the transcription-translation feedback loop as demonstrated in this video by the Howard Hughes Medical Institution. Though cyc is a clock gene and plays a role in setting and keeping rhythms, cyc is expressed constitutively (continuously) in Drosophila cells and is present in native Drosophila tissue culture cells, unlike clk, per, or tim. Regulation thus occurs primarily through the negative feedback by the PER-TIM protein complex in the transcription-translation feedback loop described above.

The CYC-CLK also interacts with the Clockwork Orange (CWO) protein in such a way that increases the robustness in the generation of high amplitude oscillations. CWO is a transcriptional repressor and antagonistic competition between CYC-CLK and CWO lead to control of E-box mediated transcription. Some findings suggest that CWO preferentially aids in the termination of CYC-CLK mediated transcription during late night.

Cyc is involved with the genetic basis of other behaviors that relate to circadian processes, such as sleep, which is important for survival, as sleep deprivation can cause death in Drosophila. There is significant correlation between having functioning cyc and longevity. Though the exact mechanism of this correlation is not known, it is suspected that it is due primarily to cyc playing a role in regulating expression of heat-shock genes, which in turn play a role in regulating duration and quality of sleep. Without proper regulation of sleep, Drosophila may become sleep deprived and die. In male Drosophila, three strains were bred, one containing no copies of functioning cyc, one containing one copy of functioning cyc, and one containing two copies of functioning cyc (wild-type). On average, Drosophila with no copies died after 48 days, Drosophila with one copy died after 52 days, and Drosophila with two copies died after 60 days. The premature deaths are accounted for by poor sleep in the absence of two functioning cyc. This effect, however, did display gender dimorphism, as female Drosophila showed no significant shortening in life span even when their cyc was knocked out. This suggests female Drosophila may have other mechanisms to compensate for a lack of cyc that male Drosophila do not possess. However, to fully understand these processes, work must be done to identify downstream interactions of CYCLE proteins. In addition, similar findings have been found in mice deficient in BMAL1, the mammalian ortholog of CYC, but without the sexual dimorphism exhibited by drosophila.

Cyc is also involved in Drosophila's responses to starvation, which also directly affect life span. Starvation in Drosophila potently suppresses sleep, suggesting that the homeostatically regulated behaviors of feeding and sleep are integrated in flies. Clk and cyc act during starvation to modulate the conflict of whether flies sleep or search for food, thus playing a critical role for proper sleep suppression during starvation.

In addition, downregulating cyc specifically in the Pdf-expressing neurons leads to decreased fasciculation both in larval and adult brains. This effect is due to a developmental role of cyc , as both knocking down cyc or expressing a dominant negative form of cyc exclusively during development lead to defasciculation phenotypes in adult clock neurons.

== Discovery ==
The identification, characterization, and cloning of cyc was reported in May 1998 in Cell by Jeffrey Hall and Michael Rosbash's labs at Brandeis University along with first author Joan E. Rutila at the Howard Hughes Medical Institute. Prior to its discovery, the mechanism by which PER and TIM transcription was regulated rhythmically was not fully understood. They published the papers reporting the discovery of CYCLE and CLOCK in the same issue of Cell. They found both genes as a result of a technique of forward genetics, chemically mutagenizing flies and screening for altered locomotor activity rhythms. From the screen, cycle was identified as a recessive arrhythmic mutant in one fly line because it shows arrhythmic locomotor activity patterns when a fly has 2 mutant chromosomes number 3. These mutant flies were also found to display arrhythmic eclosion. Because the mutants displayed no circadian rhythms and the heterozygote flies displayed long circadian periods, they determined that cycle has a dominant phenotype. These data also suggest that the Cycle gene is part of the biological clock because of the similarity between the cycle mutant phenotype and that of the clock mutant. This suggests that Cycle is part of the biological clock with its phenotype similar to that of the clock mutant. Assaying PER and TIM transcription levels in the cyc mutant showed reduced mRNA levels of both proteins. Cloning of the cyc gene revealed that it encodes a novel basic helix–loop–helix – PAS domain (bHLH-PAS) protein related to mammalian basic helix-loop-helix ARNT-like protein 1 (BMAL1), and that it likely binds to Clock to activate transcription of circadian rhythm genes.

Cycle gene expression has been discovered in a variety of cell types and tissues including the adult head, adult eye, larval/adult central nervous system, adult crop, adult midgut, adult hindgut, larval/adult Malpighian tubules, larval/adult fat body, adult salivary gland, adult female reproductive system, adult male accessory gland, and adult carcass.

Recent research on cycle has largely focused on the role of circadian rhythmicity in other processes. In 2012, it was reported that aging reduces transcriptional oscillations of core clock genes in the fly head including cycle. Wild type Drosophila show low activity of the CLOCK/CYCLE protein dimer in the morning, and it was recently found that lowering levels of these proteins can affect neuronal signaling. Research from 2012 on sleep architecture and nutrition found that circadian clock mutants, including cyc^{01} still maintained a normal diet response without circadian rhythmicity. Future work focusing on understanding the role of circadian rhythms in Drosophila will continue to investigate cycle's role in maintaining rhythmicity.

== Species distribution ==
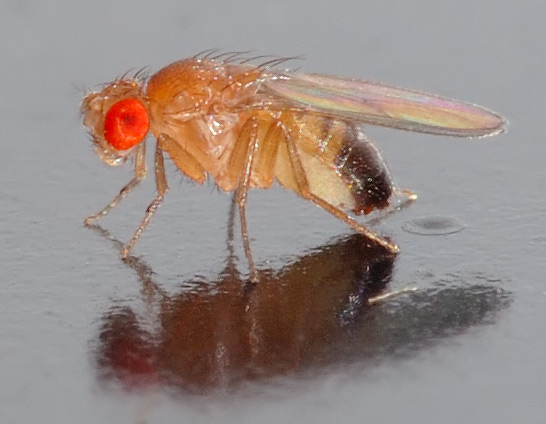
A wild type Drosophila melanogaster.

The cycle gene found in Drosophila melanogaster has many orthologs among eukaryotes including other members of the genus Drosophila, mosquitoes, various non-dipteran insects, non insect arthropods, and mammals including humans. In other members of Drosophila, functional orthologs of the D. melanogaster cycle gene can either be found in chromosome 3 or in scaffold/matrix attachment regions. In each case, the orthologs retain functional PAS domains, signal transduction function, and transcription factor activity. Other non-arthropods containing the functional ortholog of the Drosophila cycle ARNTL and ARNTL2 include humans, house mice, domestic chicken and zebrafish. Most vertebrate creatures retain a functionally and structurally similar protein. Unlike dipterans, however, these animals have two different orthologs of the cycle gene most likely caused by a gene duplication event. Much like CYCLE, the ARNTL proteins have a basic helix–loop–helix and a PAS domain containing transcription factors responsible for the autoregulatory transcription translation negative feedback loops (above), which are responsible for generating molecular circadian rhythms. For a more complete list of ARNTL homologs visit the ARNTL species distribution article.

The cyc gene found in the moth Sesamia nonagrioides, or commonly known as the Mediterranean corn borer, has been cloned in a recent study; this SnCYC was found to have 667 amino acids. Further structural analysis showed that it also contains a BCTR domain in its C-terminal in addition to the common domains found in Drosophila CYC. Researchers found that the mRNAs of Sncyc expression was rhythmic in long day (16L:8D), constant darkness, and short day (10L:14D) cycles after investigating its expression patterns in larvae brains. Further, it was found that photoperiodic conditions affect the expression patterns and/or amplitudes of this gene. In Sesamia nonagrioides, this Sncyc gene is associated with diapause. This is due to the fact that under short day (diapause conditions) the photoperiodic signal alters the accumulation of mRNA. However, in Drosophila, this gene does not oscillate or change in expression patterns in response to photoperiod, therefore suggesting that this species may be useful in further studying the molecular control of circadian and photoperiodic clocks in insects.

== Mutations ==
There are currently 19 known alleles of cyc found in Drosophila melanogaster, and most of these have been mutagenized and engineered by researchers in the laboratory.

=== Cyc^{01} ===
Cyc^{01} also known as cyc^{0} is a recessive null mutant allele. This means that a Drosophila with two copies of the cyc^{01} mutant does not produce a functional CYCLE protein. The resulting Drosophila exhibits arrhythmic activity and cannot entrain to any light-dark cycle. Cyc^{01} mutants showed a disproportionately large sleep rebound and died after 10 hours of sleep deprivation, although they were more resistant than other clock mutants to various stressors. Unlike other clock mutants, cyc^{01} flies showed a reduced expression of heat-shock genes after sleep loss. However, activating heat-shock genes before sleep deprivation rescued cyc^{01} flies from its lethal effects. This mutant exhbits abnormal neuronal morphology in clock neurons.

=== Cyc^{02} ===
Cyc^{02} is a recessive mutant, characterized by a severe reduction in levels of PER protein. In each case, the mutation was the result of a nonsense mutation in the PAS-encoding region found in 1999 following a forward screen of ethyl methanesulfonate mutants. Under both light-dark and continuous dark conditions, the cyc^{02} mutant was arrhythmic and nearly continuously active. Both the cyc^{01} and the cyc^{02} mutants were identified by the same team.

=== Cyc^{Δ} ===
Cyc^{Δ} mutation is a dominant-negative mutation which blocks the ability of CYCLE-CLOCK complexes from activating E-box dependent transcription of timeless. The mutation is the result of a 15 to 17 base pair deletion from the cyc gene.

=== Cyc^{G4677} ===
A cyc^{G4677} mutant strain is available from Bloomington Drosophila Stock Center at Indiana University. The cyc^{G4677} mutant strain is the result of a p-transposable element insertion. No information about the phenotype is publicly available.

Fifteen other mutant alleles are known, but are less commonly researched.

== See also ==
- Chronobiology
- BMAL1
- ARNTL
- CLOCK
- Oscillating gene
- Period (gene) (PER)
- Timeless (gene) (TIM)
