= Period (gene) =

Gene found in fruit flies

per

Identifiers
- Organism: D. melanogaster
- Symbol: per
- Entrez: 31251
- Orthologs: NCBI: entry; OMA: entry
- RefSeq (mRNA): NM_080317
- RefSeq (Prot): NP_525056
- UniProt: P07663

Other data
- Chromosome: X: 2.58 - 2.59 Mb
Search for
- Structures: Swiss-model
- Domains: InterPro

Period (per) is a gene located on the X chromosome of Drosophila melanogaster. Oscillations in levels of both per transcript and its corresponding protein PER have a period of approximately 24 hours and together play a central role in the molecular mechanism of the Drosophila biological clock driving circadian rhythms in eclosion and locomotor activity. Mutations in the per gene can shorten (per^{S}), lengthen (per^{L}), and even abolish (per^{0}) the period of the circadian rhythm.

== Discovery ==
The period gene and three mutants (per^{S}, per^{L}, and per^{0}) were isolated in an EMS mutagenesis screen by Ronald Konopka and Seymour Benzer in 1971. The per^{S}, per^{L}, and per^{0} mutations were found to not complement each other, so it was concluded that the three phenotypes were due to mutations in the same gene. The discovery of mutants that altered the period of circadian rhythms in eclosion and locomotor activity (per^{S} and per^{L}) indicated the role of the per gene in the clock itself and not an output pathway. The period gene was first sequenced in 1984 by Michael Rosbash and colleagues. In 1998, it was discovered that per produces two transcripts (differing only by the alternative splicing of a single untranslated intron) which both encode the PER protein.

== Function ==
=== Circadian clock ===
In Drosophila, per mRNA levels oscillate with a period of approximately 24 hours, peaking during the early subjective night. The per product PER also oscillates with a nearly 24-hour period, peaking about six hours after per mRNA levels during the middle subjective night. When PER levels increase, the inhibition of per transcription increases, lowering the protein levels. However, because PER protein cannot directly bind to DNA, it does not directly influence its own transcription; alternatively, it inhibits its own activators. After PER is produced from per mRNA, it dimerizes with Timeless (TIM) and the complex goes into the nucleus and inhibits the transcription factors of per and tim, the CLOCK/CYCLE heterodimer. This CLOCK/CYCLE complex acts as a transcriptional activator for per and tim by binding to specific enhancers (called E-boxes) of their promoters. Therefore, inhibition of CLK/CYC lowers per and tim mRNA levels, which in turn lower the levels of PER and TIM. Now, cryptochrome (CRY) is a light sensitive protein which inhibits TIM in the presence of light. When TIM is not complexed with PER, another protein, doubletime, or DBT, phosphorylates PER, targeting it for degradation.

In mammals, an analogous transcription-translation negative feedback loop is observed. Translated from the three mammalian homologs of drosophila-per, one of three PER proteins (PER1, PER2, and PER3) dimerizes via its PAS domain with one of two cryptochrome proteins (CRY1 and CRY2) to form a negative element of the clock. This PER/CRY complex moves into the nucleus upon phosphorylation by CK1-epsilon (casein kinase 1 epsilon) and inhibits the CLK/BMAL1 heterodimer, the transcription factor that is bound to the E-boxes of the three per and two cry promoters by basic helix-loop-helix (BHLH) DNA-binding domains.

The mammalian period 1 and period 2 genes play key roles in photoentrainment of the circadian clock to light pulses. This was first seen in 1999 when Akiyama et al. showed that mPer1 is necessary for phase shifts induced by light or glutamate release. Two years later, Albrecht et al. found genetic evidence to support this result when they discovered that mPer1 mutants are not able to advance the clock in response to a late-night light pulse (ZT22) and that mPer2 mutants are not able to delay the clock in response to an early night light pulse (ZT14). Thus, mPer1 and mPer2 are necessary for the daily resetting of the circadian clock to normal environmental light cues.

per has also been implicated in the regulation of several output processes of the biological clock, including mating activity and oxidative stress response, through per mutation and knockout experiments.

Drosophila melanogaster has naturally occurring variation in Thr-Gly repeats, occurring along a latitude cline. Flies with 17 Thr-Gly repeats are found more commonly in Southern Europe and 20 Thr-Gly repeats are found more commonly in Northern Europe.

=== Non-circadian ===
In addition to its circadian functions, per has also been implicated in a variety of other non-circadian processes.

The mammalian period 2 gene plays a key role in tumor growth in mice; mice with an mPer2 knockout show a significant increase in tumor development and a significant decrease in apoptosis. This is thought to be caused by mPer2 circadian deregulation of common tumor suppression and cell cycle regulation genes, such as Cyclin D1, Cyclin A, Mdm-2, and Gadd45α, as well as the transcription factor c-myc, which is directly controlled by circadian regulators through E box-mediated reactions. In addition, mPer2 knockout mice show increased sensitivity to gamma radiation and tumor development, further implicating mPer2 in cancer development through its regulation of DNA damage-responsive pathways. Thus, circadian control of clock controlled genes that function in cell growth control and DNA damage response may affect the development of cancer in vivo.

per has been shown to be necessary and sufficient for long-term memory (LTM) formation in Drosophila melanogaster. per mutants show deficiencies in LTM formation that can be rescued with the insertion of a per transgene and enhanced with overexpression of the per gene. This response is absent in mutations of other clock genes (timeless, dClock, and cycle). Research suggests that synaptic transmission through per-expressing cells is necessary for LTM retrieval.

per has also been shown to extend the lifespan of the fruit fly, suggesting a role in aging. This result, however, is still controversial, as the experiments have not been successfully repeated by another research group.

In mice it has been shown that there is a link between per2 and preferred alcohol intake. Alcohol consumption has also been linked to shortening the free running period. The effect of alcoholism on per1 and per2 genes have also linked to the depression associated with alcohol as well as an individual's disposition to relapse into alcoholism.

== Mammalian homologs of per ==
In mammals, there are three known PER family genes: PER1, PER2, and PER3. The mammalian molecular clock has homologs to the proteins found in Drosophila. A homolog of CLOCK plays the same role in the human clock, and CYC is replaced by BMAL1. CRY has two human homologs, CRY1 and CRY2, which was discovered by Edmund A. Griffin, Jr., David Staknis and Charles J. Weitz to encompass light-independent interactions with CLOCK and BMAL1. A computational model for model has been developed by Jean-Christophe Leloup and Albert Goldbeter to simulate the feedback loop created by the interactions between these proteins and genes, including the per gene and PER protein.

period homolog 1 (Drosophila)

Identifiers
- Symbol: PER1
- NCBI gene: 5187
- HGNC: 8845
- OMIM: 602260
- RefSeq: NM_002616
- UniProt: O15534

Other data
- Locus: Chr. 17 p12
Search for
- Structures: Swiss-model
- Domains: InterPro

period homolog 2 (Drosophila)

Identifiers
- Symbol: PER2
- NCBI gene: 8864
- HGNC: 8846
- OMIM: 603426
- RefSeq: NM_003894
- UniProt: O15055

Other data
- Locus: Chr. 2 q37.3
Search for
- Structures: Swiss-model
- Domains: InterPro

period homolog 3 (Drosophila)

Identifiers
- Symbol: PER3
- NCBI gene: 8863
- HGNC: 8847
- OMIM: 603427
- RefSeq: NM_016831
- UniProt: P56645

Other data
- Locus: Chr. 1 p36.23
Search for
- Structures: Swiss-model
- Domains: InterPro

The human homologs show sequence and amino acid similarity to Drosophila Per and also contain the PAS domain and nuclear localization sequences that the Drosophila Per have. The human proteins are expressed rhythmically in the suprachiasmatic nucleus as well as areas outside the SCN. Additionally, while Drosophila PER moves between the cytoplasm and the nucleus, mammalian PER is more compartmentalized: mPer1 primarily localizes to the nucleus and mPer2 to the cytoplasm.

=== Clinical significance ===
Familial advanced sleep-phase syndrome known to be associated with mutations in the mammalian Per2 gene. People suffering from the disorder have a shorter period and advanced phase where they go to sleep in the early evening (around 7pm) and wake up before sunrise (around 4am). In 2006, a lab in Germany identified particular phosphorylated residues of PER2 that are mutated in people suffering of FASPS. Chronotherapy is sometimes used as a treatment, as an attempt to alter the phase of the individual's clock using cycles of bright light.

== See also ==
- Clock gene
- Suprachiasmatic nucleus
- Timeless (gene)
- Oscillating gene
- PDF
- Michael Rosbash
