= Zinc finger protein 730 =

Protein found in humans

ZNF730

Identifiers
- Aliases: ZNF730, zinc finger protein 730
- External IDs: GeneCards: ZNF730

Gene location (Human)
Chr.	Chromosome 19 (human)
Band	19p12	Start	23,075,210 bp
Band	19p12	End	23,147,221 bp
RNA expression pattern
Bgee	Human / Mouse (ortholog); Top expressed in: testicle; gonad; ganglionic eminence; ventricular zone; endometrium; Achilles tendon; right testis; left testis; corpus callosum; rectum / n/a; More reference expression data
BioGPS	n/a
Gene ontology
Molecular function	metal ion binding; DNA binding; nucleic acid binding; DNA-binding transcription factor activity, RNA polymerase II-specific
Cellular component	intracellular anatomical structure; nucleus
Biological process	transcription, DNA-templated; regulation of transcription, DNA-templated; regulation of transcription by RNA polymerase II
Sources:Amigo / QuickGO
Orthologs
Databases	NCBI: entry; OMA: entry
Species	Human	Mouse
Entrez	100129543	n/a
Ensembl	ENSG00000183850	n/a
UniProt	Q6ZMV8	n/a
RefSeq (mRNA)	NM_001277403	n/a
RefSeq (protein)	NP_001264332	n/a
Location (UCSC)	Chr 19: 23.08 – 23.15 Mb	n/a
PubMed search		n/a
- Wikidata
View/Edit Human

Zinc finger protein 730 is a protein that in humans is encoded by the ZNF730 gene. It is located on the short arm of chromosome 19. Zinc finger protein 730 is speculated to play a role in transcriptional regulation in acute myeloid leukemia and endometrial cancer. This is because ZNF730 was found to be expressed in higher levels in endometrial cancerous tumor samples and has been reported as a core binding factor in acute myeloid leukemia. Zinc Finger protein 730 is a Cys_{2}His_{2}-type zinc finger protein containing a β/β/α structure, held in place by a Zinc ion. The Cys_{2}His_{2}-type protein motifs can regulate transcription by recognizing and binding to DNA sequences.

== Gene ==
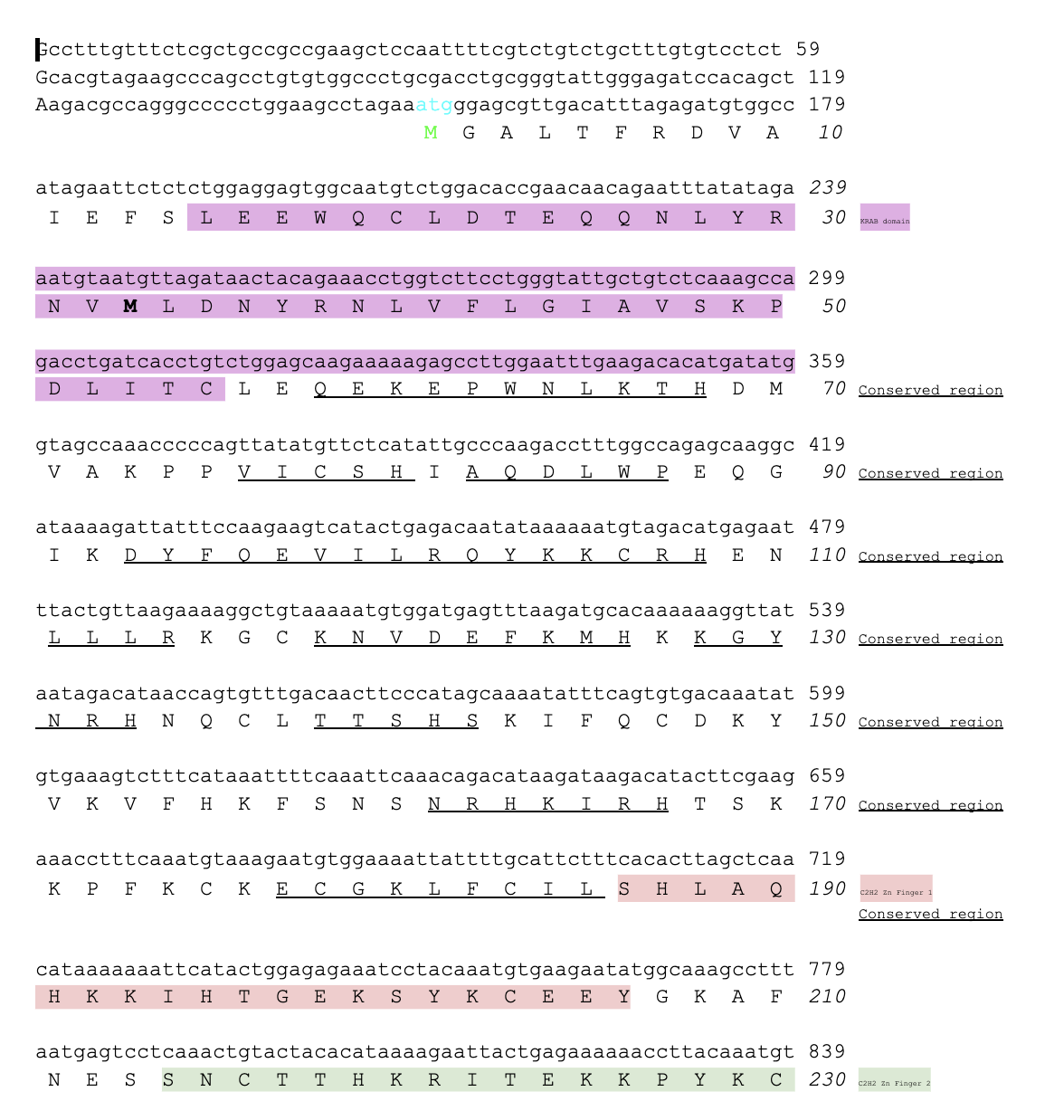
Annotated ZNF730 Conceptual Translation

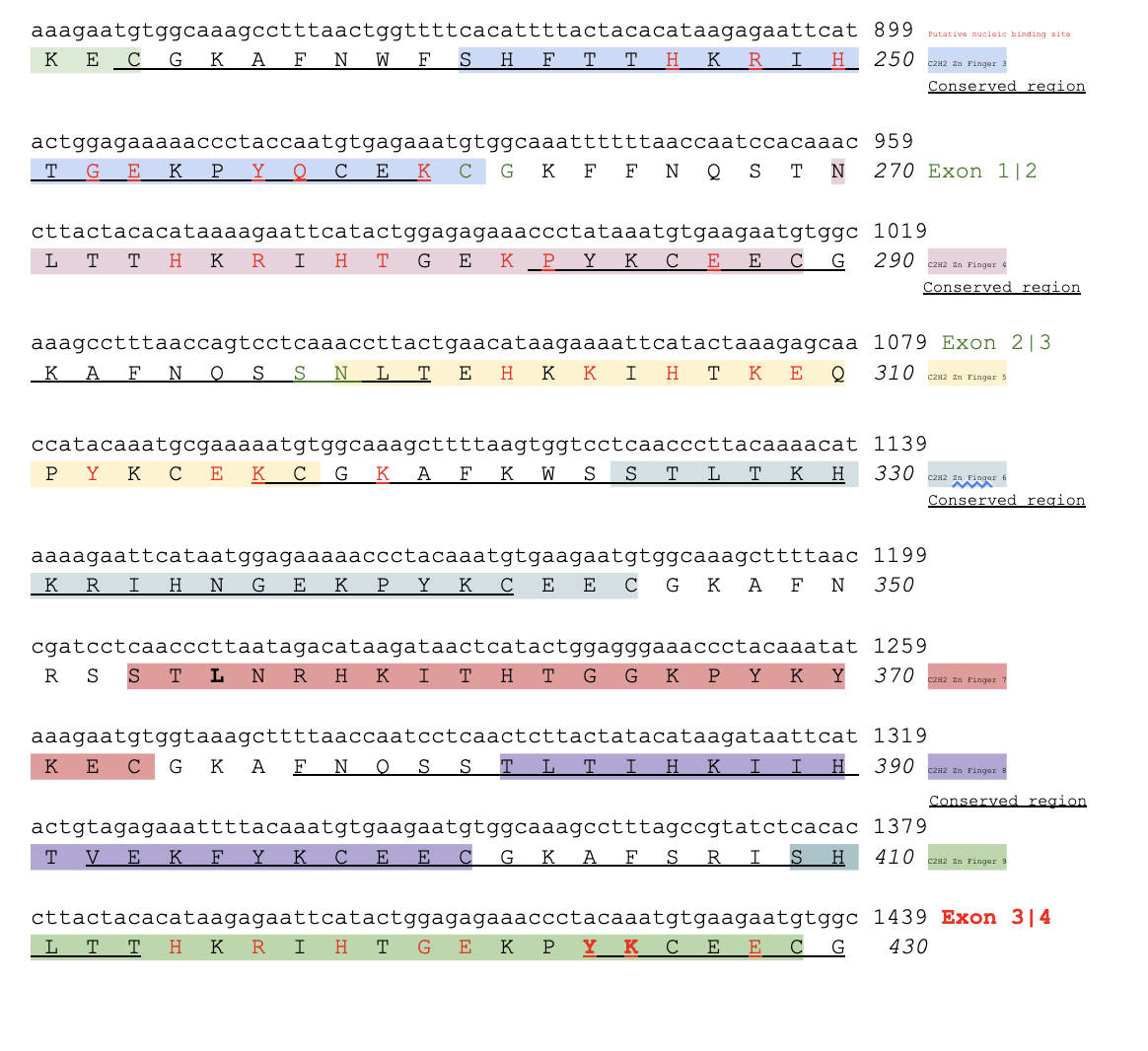
Annotated ZNF730 Conceptual Translation

The human ZNF730 gene is 5533 nucleotides long and it encodes transcript variant 1 which is the longest isoform. The gene locus is 19p12 and it is found on the plus strand. ZNF730 consists of 14 exons, it encodes for one Kruppel Associated Box (KRAB), and 12 Cys_{2}His_{2} Zinc Fingers.

== mRNA/transcript ==
The mRNA isoform 1 encoded by the human ZNF730 gene is 514 nucleotides long. There are 7 isoforms of the ZNF839 mRNA.

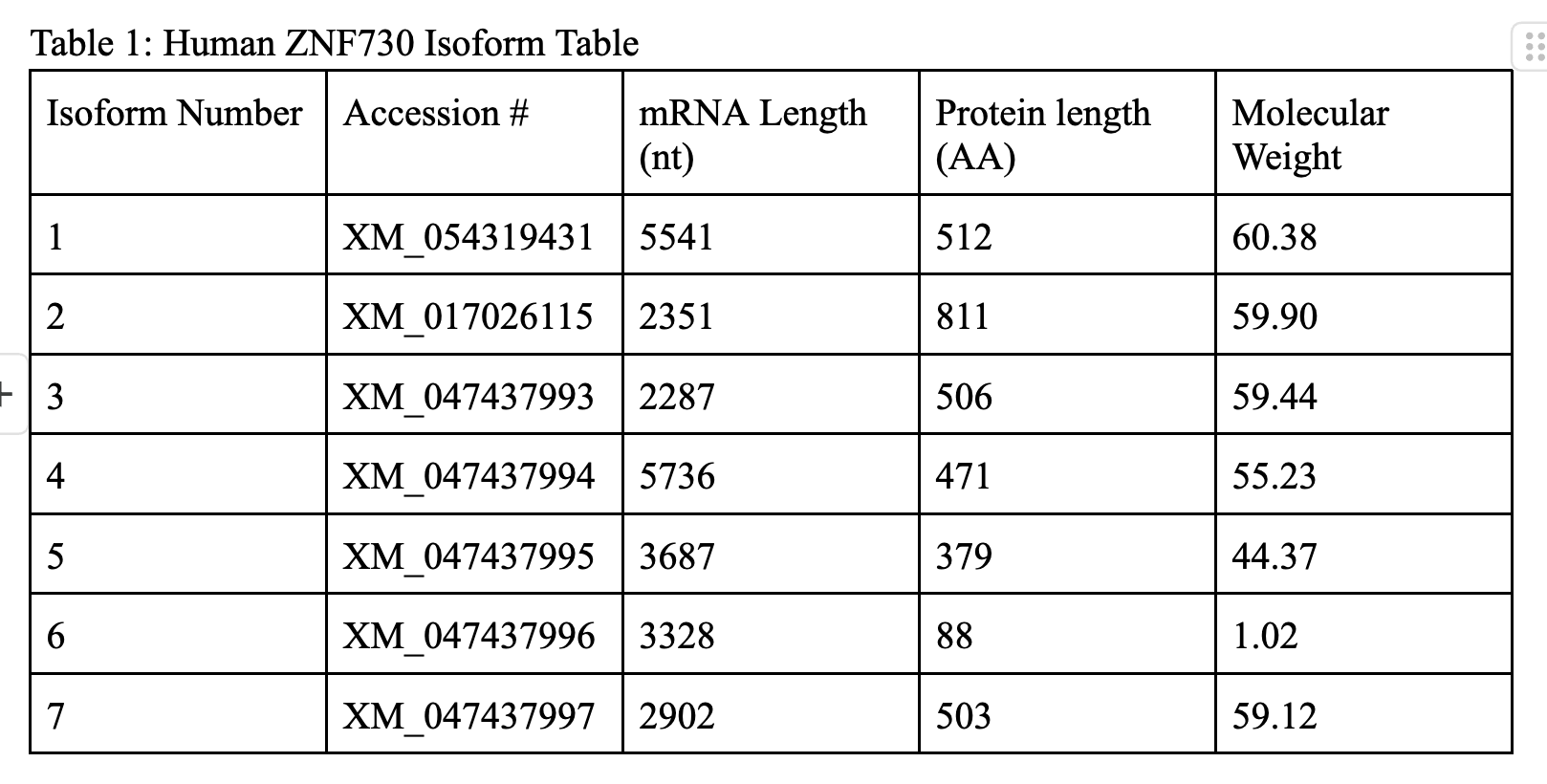
Human ZNF730 Isoform Table

== Expression ==
Through an HPA-RNA sequencing analysis of 12 different human tissues, protein ZNF730 has been found in high levels within the testis. High expression in the testis is likely because of Cys_{2}His_{2}-zinc fingers playing a role in spermatogenesis, which occurs inside the seminiferous tubules.

ZNF730 was also found to be expressed in high levels within the brain, lymph nodes, and placenta. The high expression of ZNF730 in the brain, specifically the cerebellum, may be related to zinc finger proteins (Zin1 and Zinc2) being present in the cerebellum for the development of the central nervous system and regulating signaling pathways.

== Protein ==
The molecular weight of ZNF730 Isoform 1 has a theoretical molecular weight of 60296.34 Da. The protein's isoelectric point is predicted to be 9.5 in humans. The average isoelectric point in Homo sapiens is 6.64, so this value is higher than average. Based on the SAPS tool, there are no positive, negative or neutral charge custers. It has been predicted that ZNF730 X1 has higher amounts of Histidine and Lysine than normal, and lower amounts of Valine.

ZNF730 X1 was found to have 10 predicted sites of glycosylation and 16 phosphorylation. The protein has been predicted to contain two LIM domains at 267-335 aa and also 407-475 aa. This double-zinc finger motif is specific to zinc-finger proteins, made up of three genes: LIN-11, Isl-1 and MEC-3.

=== Subcellular localization ===
The human Zinc Finger Protein 730 has been predicted to be localized in the nucleus of the cell, due to its transcription factor role. It is predicted to be localized 95.7% to the nucleus and 4.3% to the mitochondria.

=== Tertiary structure ===
The structure is composed of 17 alpha helices, 12 beta sheets, and 38 coil-coils.

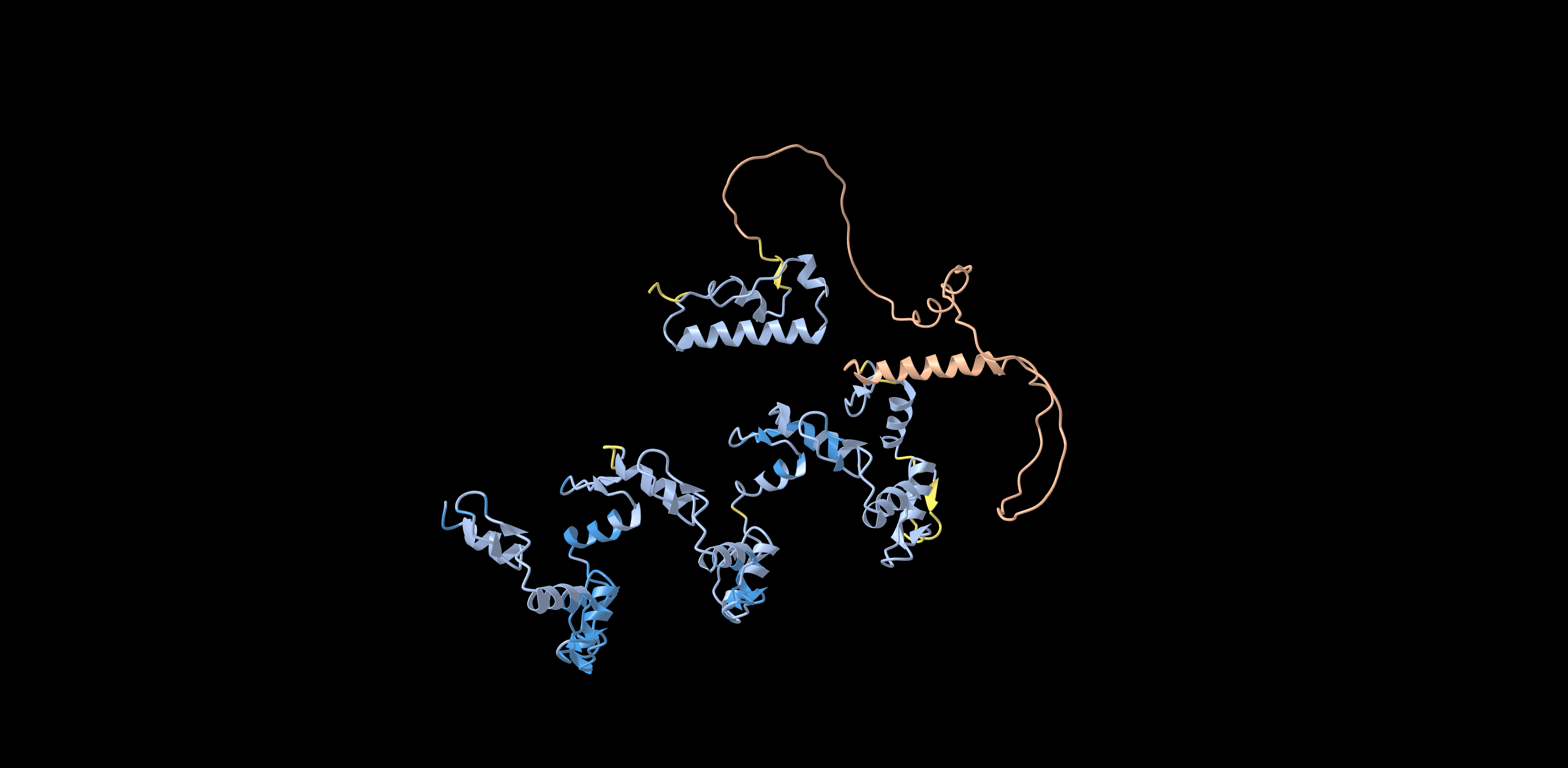
Tertiary Protein Structure for Zinc Finger 730 annotated using iCN3D.

== Function ==
ZNF730 was found to have 3 interacting proteins: MOD_CK1_1, MOD_GSK3_1 and MOD_SUMO_rev_2. It was found that MOD_CK1_1 is a Casein kinase 1 (CK1) phosphorylation site, found in the cytosl and nucleus, responsible for regulating signal transduction pathways in eukaryotes. The CK1 family are serine/threonine-selective enzymes. MOD_GSK3_ is a Glycogen Synthase Kinase 3 (GSK-3) site that phosphorylates threonine or serine. MOD_SUMO_rev_2 is an inverted version of SUMOylation motif recognized for modification by SUMO-1. SUMOylation occurs when SUMO proteins covalently bind to lysine residues in a target protein. It is a post-translational modification process that likely occurs in ZNF730.

== Clinical significance ==
A relationship has been found between ZNF730 protein mutations and endometrial cancer tumor protein composition. 2.1% of endometrial tumor samples have been shown to have ZNF730 oncogenic missense mutations. 0.4% of breast cancer tumors were also found to have ZNF730 missense mutations.

== Post-translational modifications ==
Zinc Finger Protein 730 is predicted to have 25 SUMOylation sites, 10 predicted sites of glycosylation and 16 predicted sites of phosphorylation.

== Evolution ==
=== Orthologs ===
ZNF730 has 3 orthologs that are all mammals. Zinc Finger Protein 730 Belongs to the Krueppel Cys_{2}His_{2}-type zinc-finger protein family and first appeared in mammals 28.8 million years ago in both Rhinopithecus bieti and Colobus angolensis palliatus. It later diverged into a different primate, Pongo pygmaeus, 15.2 million years ago.

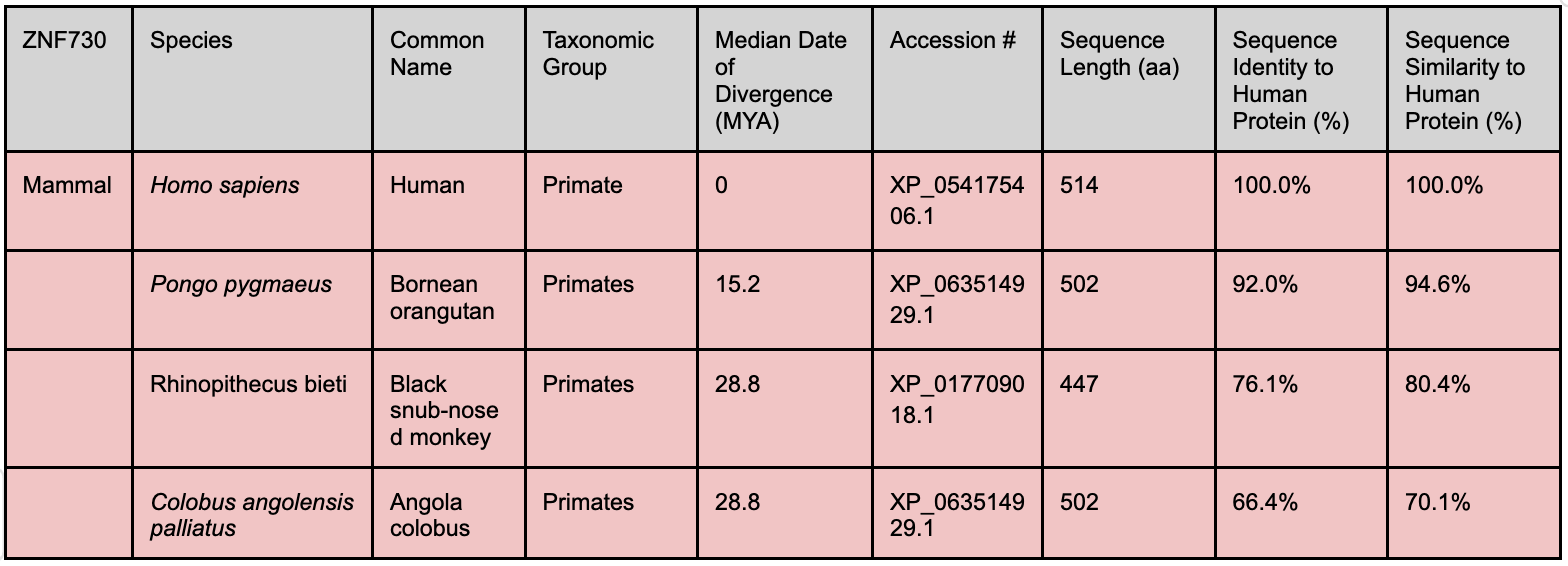
Orthologs of ZNF730 in Homo Sapiens sorted first by smallest MYA and second by sequence identity to human protein.

=== Paralogs ===
ZNF730 has many paralogs. The 10 paralogs with the highest similarity to ZNF730 X1 were chosen for Table 3.

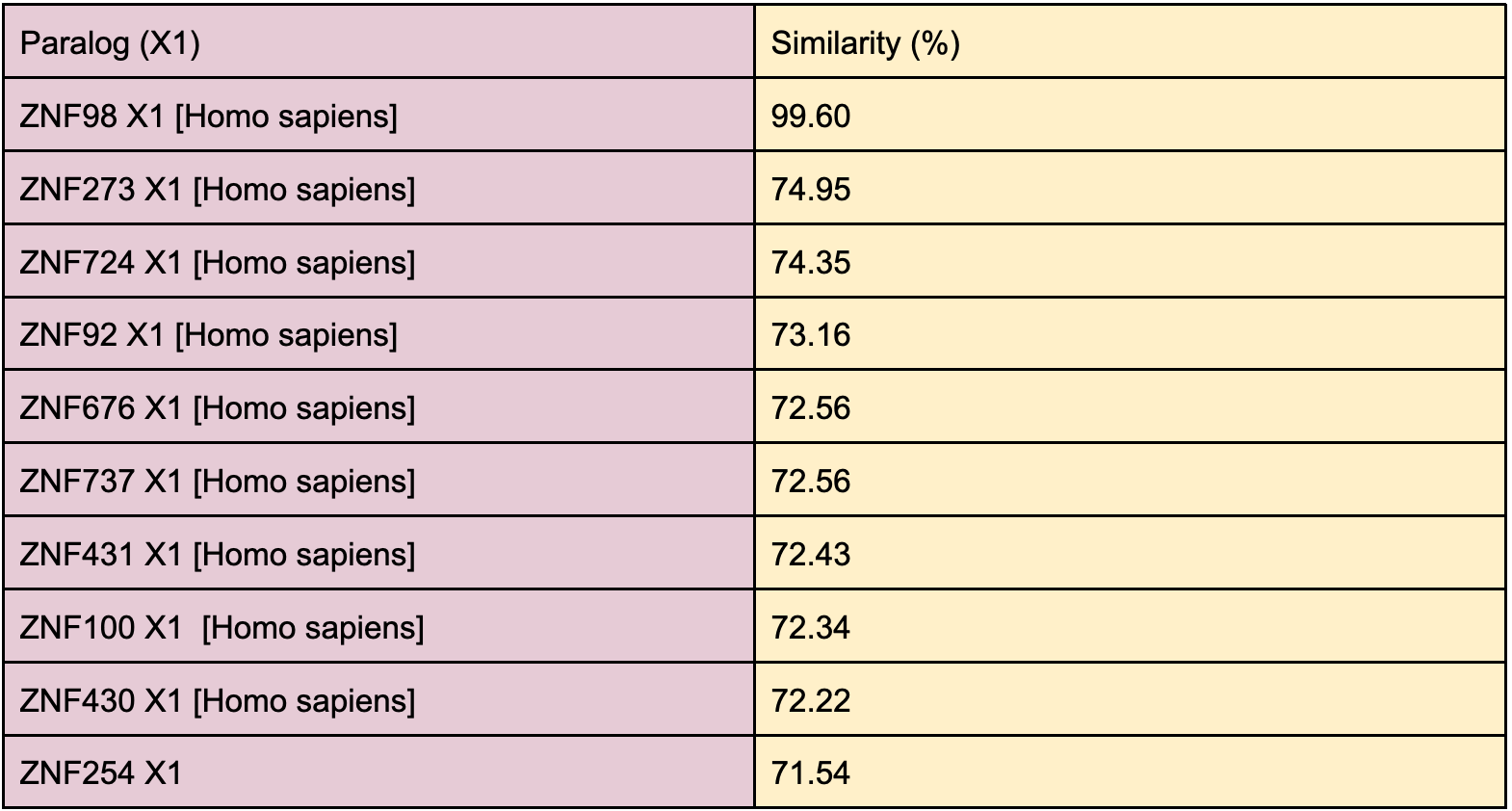
Paralogs of ZNF730 sorted by highest to lowest percent similarity to human ZNF730 protein sequence.

== Evolution rate ==
The following figure visualizes the rate of divergence as compared to the fibrinogen alpha chain and the cytochrome C chain. Based on the graph, ZNF730 evolved at a rate similar to that of Cytochrome C because they have similar slopes. ZNF730 evolved at a slower rate than the Fibrinogen Alpha chain, which had a much higher slope.

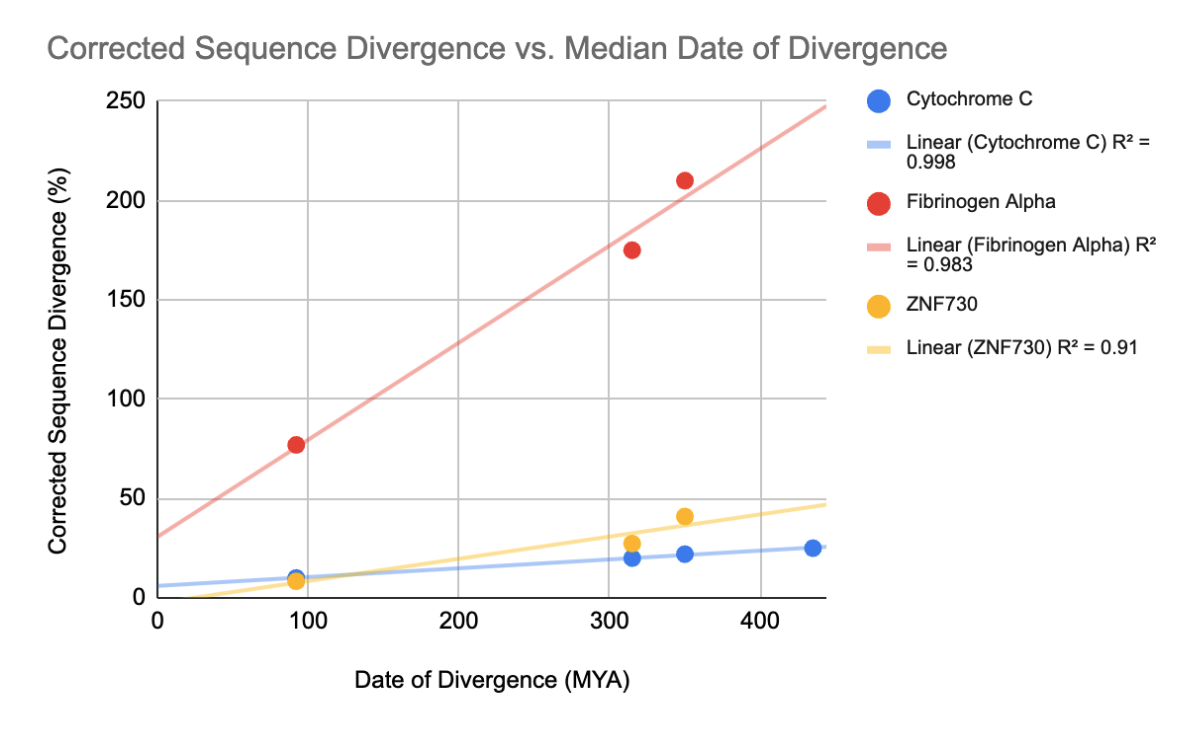
Corrected Sequence Divergence vs. Median Date of Divergence for Zinc Finger Protein 730.
