= Casein kinase 1 =

Family of protein kinases

The Casein kinase 1 family (EC 2.7.11.1) of protein kinases are serine/threonine-selective enzymes that function as regulators of signal transduction pathways in most eukaryotic cell types. CK1 isoforms are involved in Wnt signaling, circadian rhythms, nucleo-cytoplasmic shuttling of transcription factors, DNA repair, and DNA transcription.

== Discovery ==
By the early 1950s it was known from metabolic labeling studies using radioactive phosphate that phosphate groups attached to phosphoproteins inside cells can sometimes undergo rapid exchange of new phosphate for old. In order to perform experiments that would allow isolation and characterization of the enzymes involved in attaching and removing phosphate from proteins, there was a need for convenient substrates for protein kinases and protein phosphatases. Casein has been used as a substrate since the earliest days of research on protein phosphorylation. By the late 1960s, cyclic AMP-dependent protein kinase had been purified, and most attention was centered on kinases and phosphatases that could regulate the activity of important enzymes. Casein kinase activity associated with the endoplasmic reticulum of mammary glands was first characterized in 1974, and its activity was shown to not depend on cyclic AMP.

== CK1 family ==
casein kinase 1, alpha 1
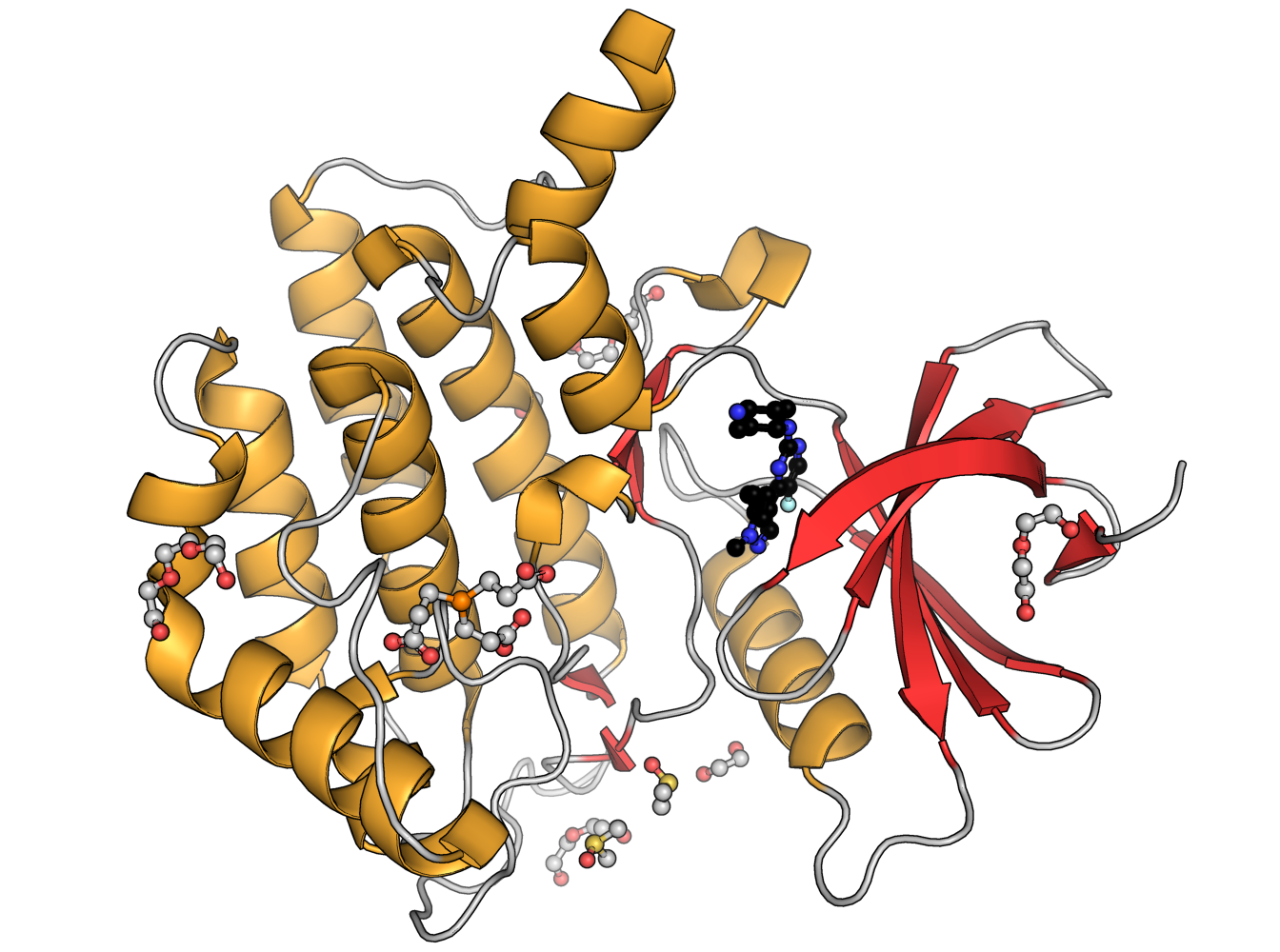
- Human casein kinase 1 alpha bound to inhibitor (black). PDB: 6GZD

Identifiers
- Symbol: CSNK1A1
- NCBI gene: 1452
- OMIM: 600505
- UniProt: P48729
Search for
- Structures: Swiss-model
- Domains: InterPro

The CK1 family of monomeric serine–threonine protein kinases is found in eukaryotic organisms from yeast to humans. Mammals have seven family members (sometimes referred to as isoforms, but encoded by distinct genes): alpha, beta 1, gamma 1, gamma 2, gamma 3, delta, and epsilon. Isoforms range from 22 to 55 kDa and have been identified in the membranes, nucleus, and cytoplasm of eukaryotes and additionally in the mitotic spindle in mammalian cells. The family members have the highest homology in their kinase domains (53%–98% identical) and differ from most other protein kinases by the presence of the sequence S-I-N instead of A-P-E in kinase domain VIII. The family members appear to have similar substrate specificity in vitro, and substrate selection is thought to be regulated in vivo via subcellular localization and docking sites in specific substrates. One consensus phosphorylation site is S/Tp-X-X-S/T, where S/Tp refers to a phospho-serine or phospho-threonine, X refers to any amino acid, and the underlined residues refer to the target site. Thus, this CKI consensus site requires priming by another kinase. CKI also phosphorylates a related unprimed site, which optimally contains a cluster of acidic amino acids N-terminal to the target S/T including an acidic residue at n − 3 and a hydrophobic region C-terminal to the target S/T. A single acidic residue in the n − 3 position is not sufficient for CKI phosphorylation. In contrast, in several important targets, NF-AT and beta-catenin, CKI does not require n − 3 priming but, instead, phosphorylates the first serine in the sequence S-L-S, which is followed by a cluster of acidic residues, albeit less efficiently than the optimal sites.

== Roles ==
casein kinase 1, gamma 1
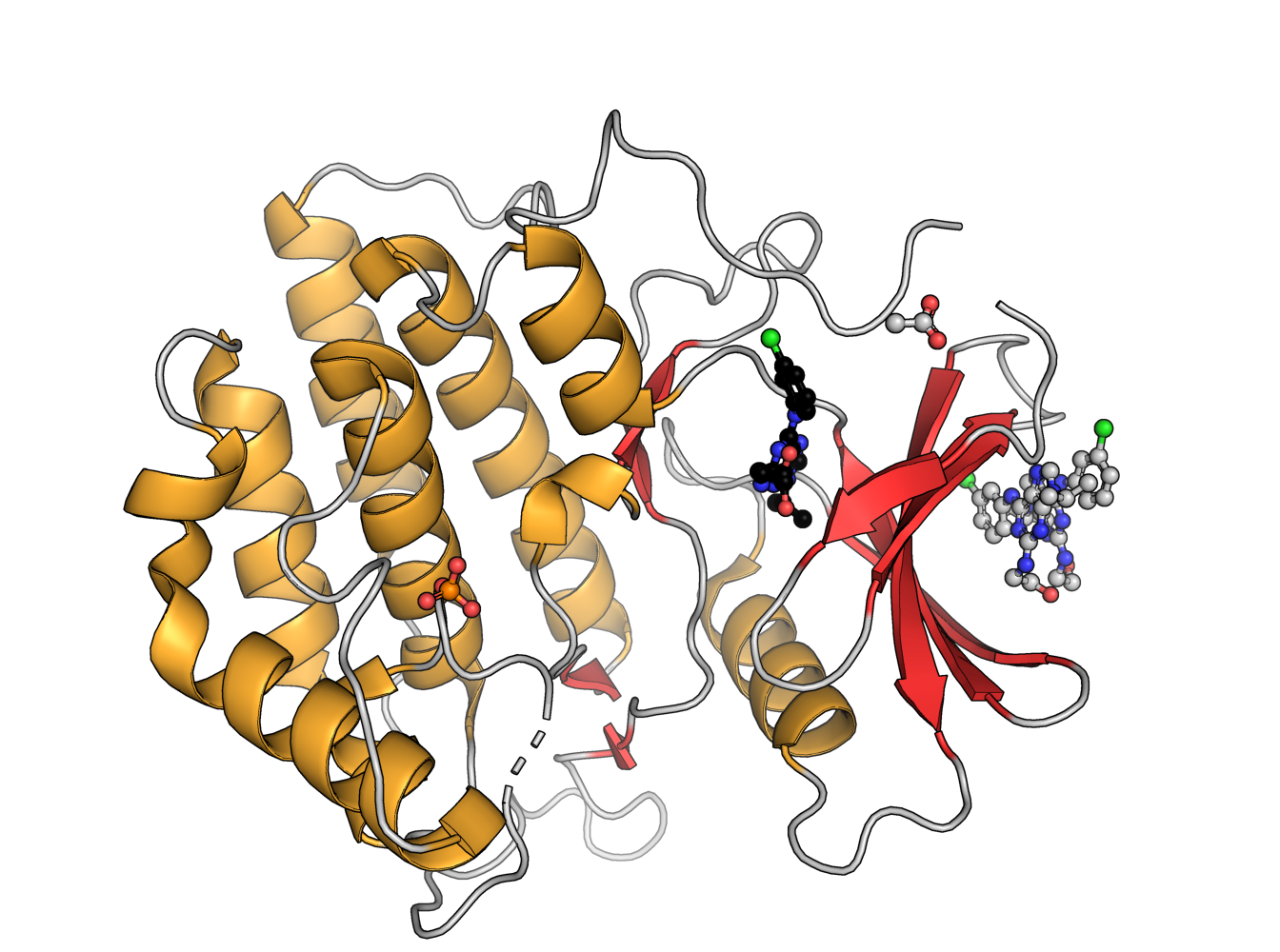
- Human casein kinase 1 gamma 1 bound to inhibitor (black). PDB: 2CMW

Identifiers
- Symbol: CSNK1G1
- NCBI gene: 53944
- OMIM: 606274
- UniProt: Q9HCP0
Search for
- Structures: Swiss-model
- Domains: InterPro

casein kinase 1, gamma 2
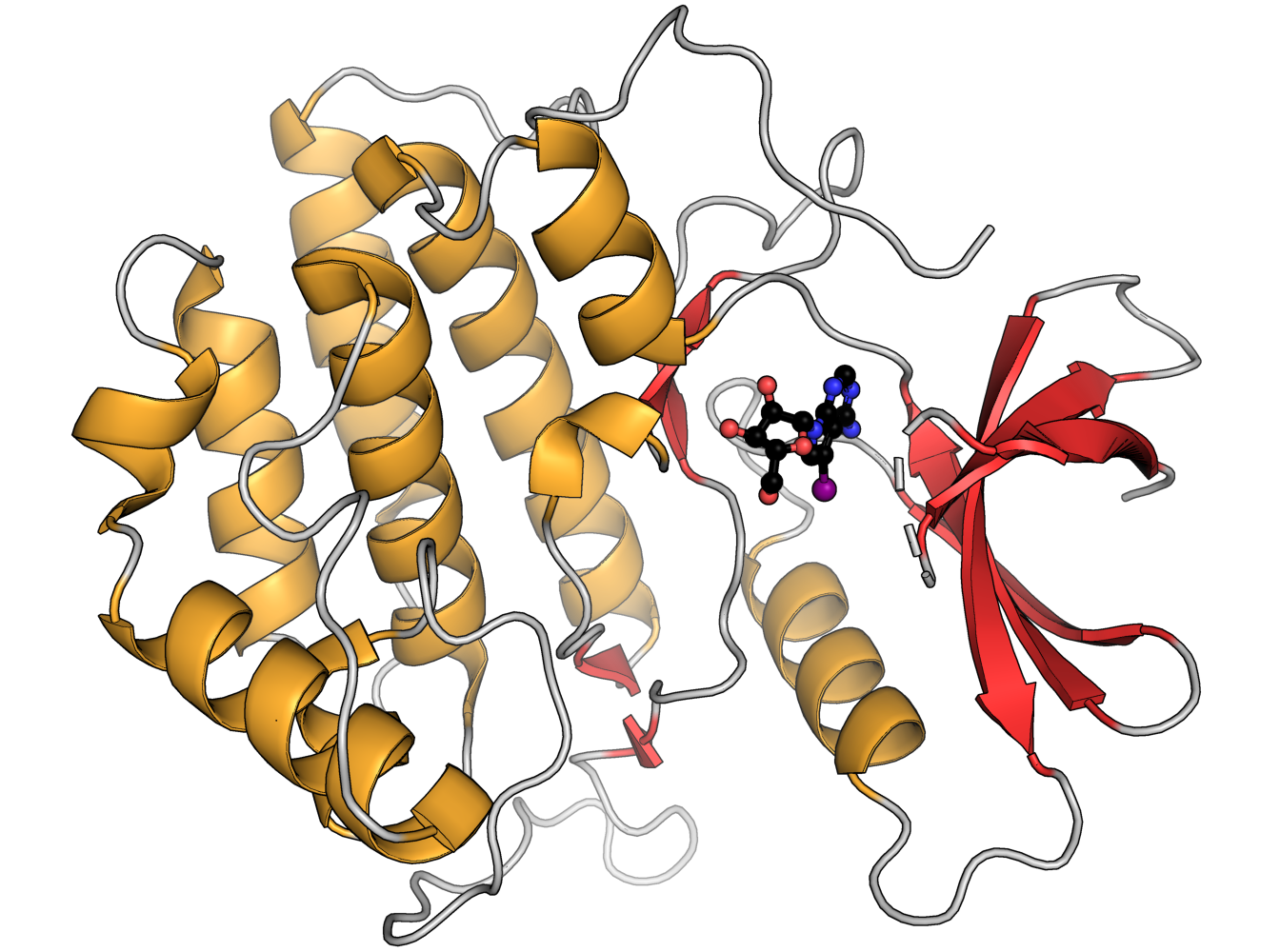
- Human casein kinase 1 gamma 2 bound to 5-iodotubercidin. PDB: 2C47

Identifiers
- Symbol: CSNK1G2
- NCBI gene: 1455
- OMIM: 602214
- UniProt: P78368
Search for
- Structures: Swiss-model
- Domains: InterPro

casein kinase 1, gamma 3
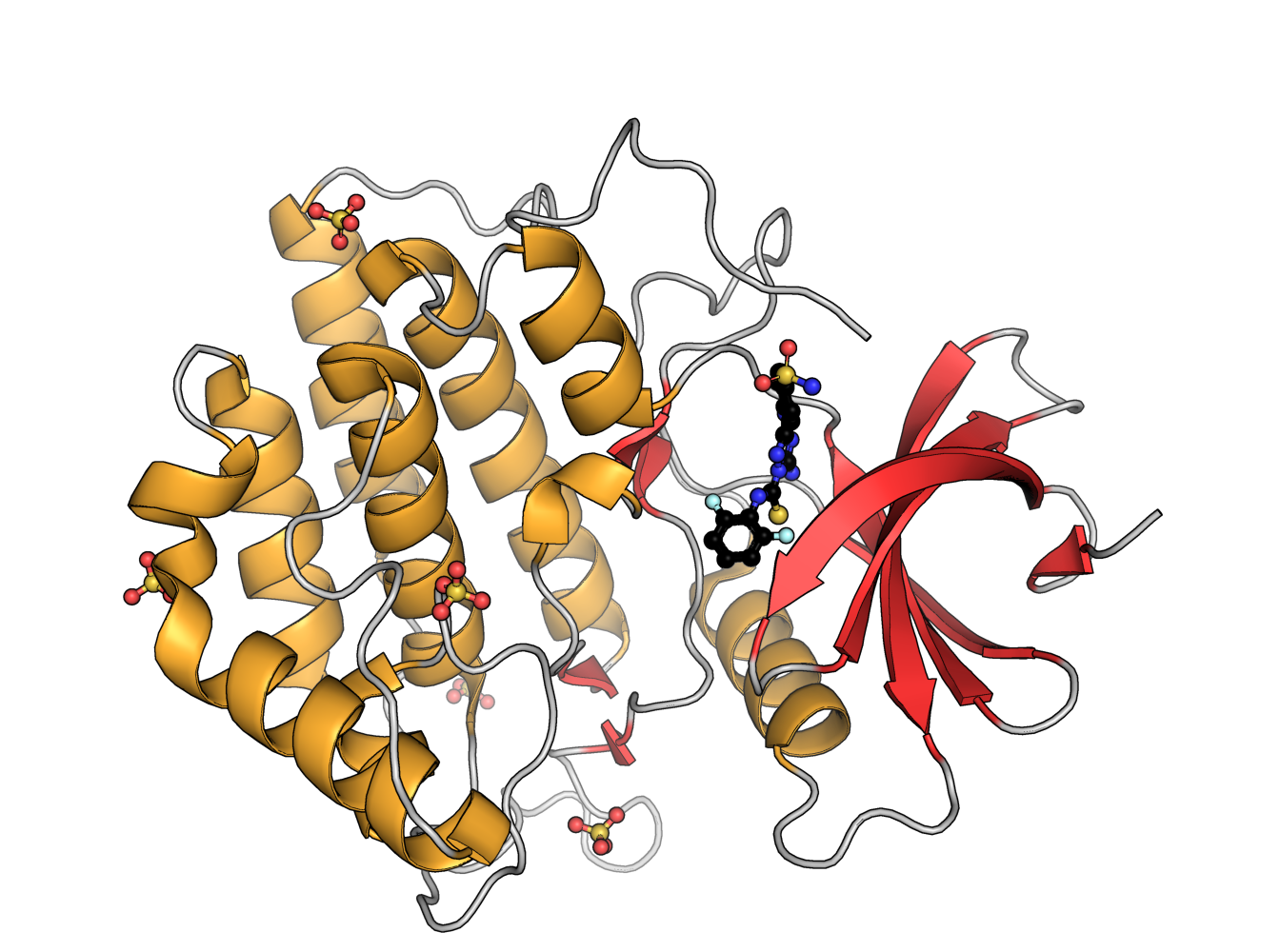
- Human casein kinase 1 gamma 3 bound to inhibitor (black). PDB: 2CHL

Identifiers
- Symbol: CSNK1G3
- NCBI gene: 1456
- OMIM: 604253
- UniProt: Q9Y6M4
Search for
- Structures: Swiss-model
- Domains: InterPro

casein kinase 1, delta
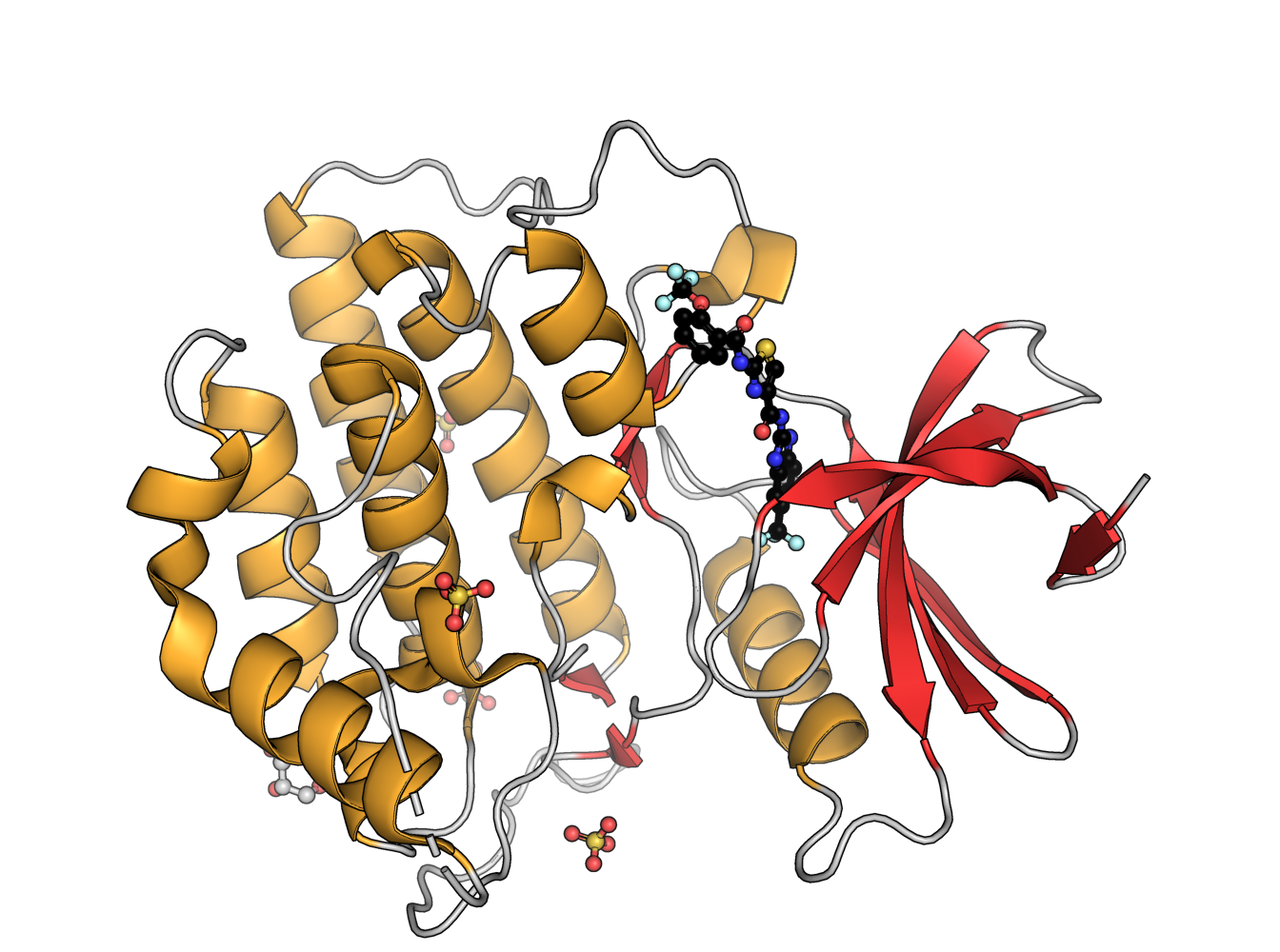
- Human casein kinase 1 delta bound to inhibitor (black). PDB: 4TWC

Identifiers
- Symbol: CSNK1D
- Alt. symbols: HCKID; CSNK1D
- NCBI gene: 1453
- OMIM: 600864
- UniProt: P8730
Search for
- Structures: Swiss-model
- Domains: InterPro

casein kinase 1, epsilon
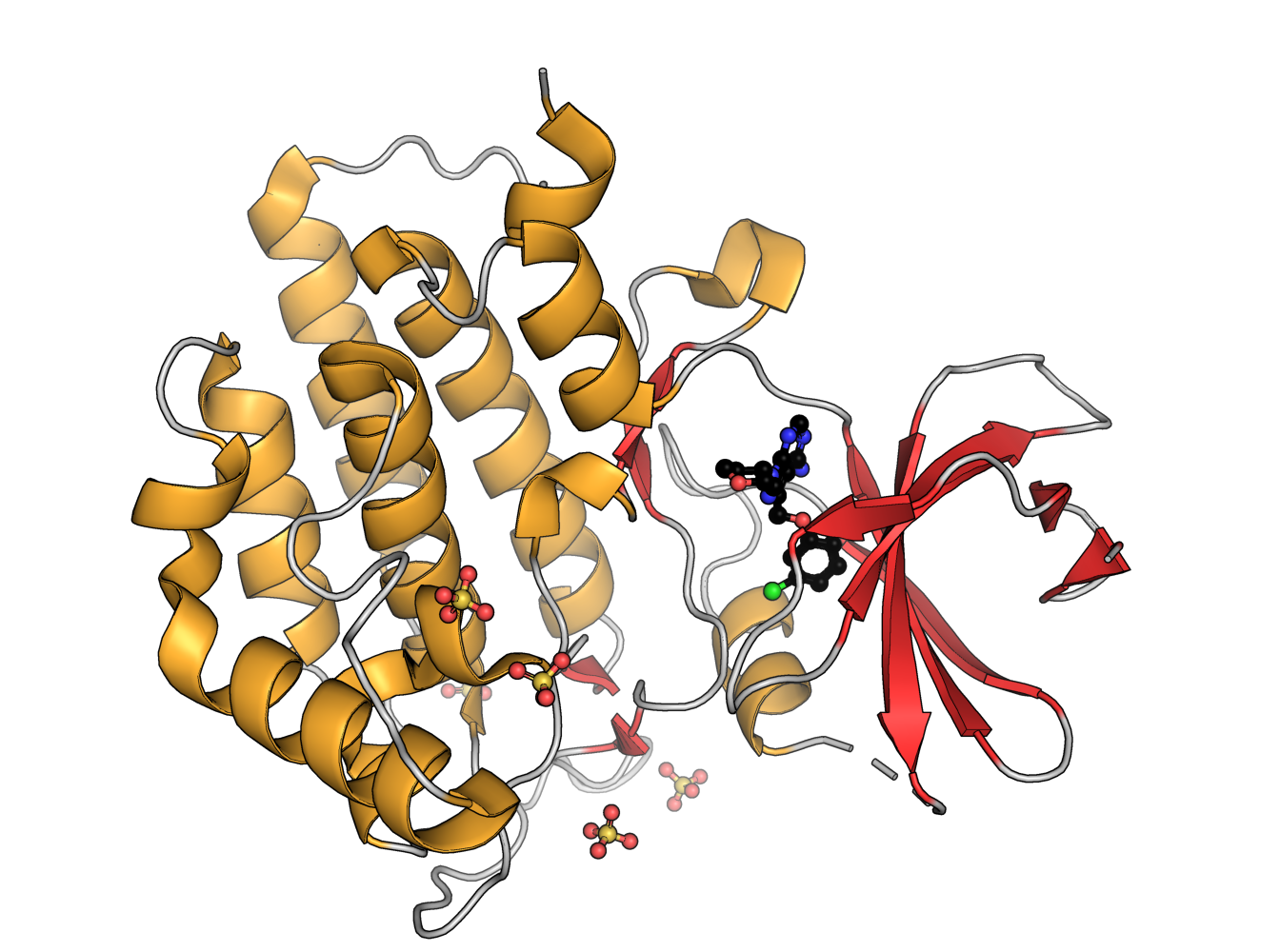
- Human casein kinase 1 epsilon bound to inhibitor PF-4800567 (black). PDB: 4HNI

Identifiers
- Symbol: CSNK1E
- Alt. symbols: HCKIE
- NCBI gene: 1454
- OMIM: 600863
- UniProt: P49674
Search for
- Structures: Swiss-model
- Domains: InterPro

Casein kinase activity was found to be present in most cell types and to be associated with multiple enzymes. The type 1 casein kinase family of related gene products are now given designations such as "casein kinase 1 alpha" and "casein kinase 1 epsilon".

=== Wnt signaling pathway ===
Casein kinase 1 epsilon has been suggested to play a role in phosphorylation of Disheveled in the Wnt signaling pathway. Casein kinase 1 alpha (CK1α) binds to and phosphorylates β‑catenin

In plants the phosphorylation of protein Jade-1 is regulated by casein kinase 1. In humans there are three casein kinase 1 gamma enzymes.

Xenopus casein kinase 1 gamma (CK1gamma) is associated with the cell membrane and binds to LRP. CK1gamma was found to be needed for Wnt signaling through LRP, and is both necessary and sufficient to transduce LRP6 signaling in vertebrates and Drosophila cells. Wnt binding to LRP causes a rapid increase in phosphorylation of the cytoplasmic domain of LRP by CK1gamma. Phosphorylation of LRP6 by CK1gamma promotes binding of axin to LRP and activation of the Wnt signaling pathway.

=== Circadian rhythm ===
CK1ε and CK1δ are essential in the genetic transcription-translation (and post-translation) feedback loops that generate circadian rhythm in mammals.

The previously-characterized CK1ε isoform was first implicated as a clock gene when its Drosophila homolog, double-time (Doubletime (gene)), was discovered in 1998. Double-time is 86% identical to human CK1ε. Kloss et al and Price et al showed that mutations in double-time altered circadian rhythm. They found two DBT mutants that had abnormal free-running periods and one that was pupal-lethal but resulted in accumulations of hypophosphorylated PER protein. Since then, double-time's protein product DBT has been well characterized for its role in phosphorylating PER, the protein product of clock gene period in Drosophila.

The role of CK1 in mammalian circadian rhythms was first identified through a spontaneous mutation in hamsters. Homologs were subsequently identified in mice, and characterisation shows it plays a similar role to that proposed for Drosophila.

In 2021, scientists reported the development of a light-responsive days-lasting modulator of circadian rhythms of tissues via Ck1 inhibition. Such modulators may be useful for chronobiology research and repair of organs that are "out of sync".

==== Interactions ====
DBT has been shown to physically interact with PER in vitro and in vivo, and to create a stable complex with PER throughout the circadian cycle. PER that has been phosphorylated by DBT is recognized by the Slimb protein. Slimb is a component of the Skp1/Cullin/F-box protein (SCF) ubiquitin ligase complex, which marks proteins for proteasomal degradation in a phosphorylation-dependent manner. Enhanced PER degradation in the cytoplasm is predicted to delay nuclear translocation of both PER and TIM, and to thus affect the period of circadian rhythms.

The mutation dbtS, associated with a proline to serine substitution at residue 47 [P47S], shortens period length by about 6 h. dbtL contains an amino acid substitution of isoleucine for methionine at residue 80 (M80I) and lengthens period to 29 h. A third mutation, dbtAR, is associated with a change from histidine 126 to tyrosine and causes arrhythmia. PER protein in this mutant is hypophosphorylated. Each of these mutations maps to the kinase domain of DBT gene. The short- and long-period alleles of DBT enhance or attenuate, respectively, PER degradation in the nucleus, further demonstrating the importance of timely PER degradation as a critical determinant in establishing 24-h rhythmicity. In addition to influencing protein degradation, DBT affects the timing of nuclear accumulation of PER. The short-period mutant dbtS delays PER nuclear accumulation, which is independent of PER protein stability, and arrhythmic alleles of dbt cause nuclear accumulation of PER in clock-containing cells of larval and adult Drosophila.

Both mammalian CK1δ and CK1ε contain closely related 123-amino-acid carboxy-terminal domains that can auto-regulate kinase activity. CK1δ and CK1ε are 53% identical. These domains are not related to the carboxy-terminal domain of double-time, suggesting a split in the evolution of the mammalian and fly homologs. A similar function for casein kinase 2 has been reported in Arabidopsis thaliana, Drosophila, and Neurospora.

==== Positive and negative feedback ====
In the negative feedback loops, CK1ε periodically binds to and phosphorylates the PER proteins (PER1, PER2, and PER3), which form heterodimers with each other and interact with CRY1 and CRY2. The effects of phosphorylation are two-fold. It has been shown in Drosophila that phosphorylation of the PER proteins increase their ubiquitination, which leads to degradation. Phosphorylation of the PER proteins also leaves them unable to enter the nucleus, where they suppress transcription of clock genes. The blocking of nuclear translocation occurs via phosphorylation of PER at the nuclear localization signal, which masks the signal and prevents nuclear entry. However, this CK1ε-mediated constraint to the cytoplasm can be overcome when the PER protein complex is bound to CRY. CK1ε has been shown to phosphorylate CRY when both CK1ε and CRY are complexed with PER in vitro, but the functional significance of this remains undetermined.

CK1ε may also have a role in positive feedback; the transcription factor BMAL1 is a CK1ε substrate in vitro, and increased CK1ε activity has been shown to positively regulate transcription of genes under the influence of BMAL1-dependent circadian gene promoters. This has not yet been studied in vivo.

==== Significance in disease ====
CK1δ and CK1ε have been shown to be relevant in human disease. Recent findings indicate that pharmaceutical inhibition of CK1 may be a promising therapeutic for aberrant circadian rhythm. Mutations and variants of the CK1ε phosphorylation site of PER2 are associated with cases of Familial Advanced Sleep Phase Syndrome (FASPS). Similarly, length variations in the CK1ε phosphorylation site of PER3 have been found to correlate with 'morningness' and 'eveningness'; longer alleles are associated with early risers while shorter alleles are associated with late risers. Additionally, 75% of patients with Delayed sleep phase syndrome are homozygous for the shorter allele.

Mutations in CK1 have been shown to alter circadian behavior in other mammals, as well. In 1988, the golden hamster tau mutant, which has a freerunning period of 22hrs, was the first mammalian circadian mutant discovered. Twelve years later in 2000, the tau mutation was mapped to CK1ε. Since its discovery, the tau mutant has proven to be a valuable research tool in circadian biology. CK1ɛ^{tau}, a T178C substitution, is a gain-of function mutation that causes an increase in degradation of PER, but not CRY. This creates a disruption in the PER-regulated feedback loop and consequently an acceleration of molecular oscillations. Homozygous mutants (CK1ε(tau/tau)) show a significant decrease in period, both in vivo (behaviorally) and in vitro (measured by firing rates of the suprachiasmatic nucleus). Recent research has also identified a link between mutations in the CK1δ gene and familial migraine and advanced sleep phase, a finding that was replicated in mice migraine models.

==== Roles of isoforms ====
CK1δ and CK1ε were thought to be generally redundant in circadian cycle length and protein stability. Recent research, however, has shown that CK1δ deficiency lengthens circadian period while CK1ε deficiency does not. Also, CK1α has recently been suggested to play a role redundant to CK1δ in phosphorylating PER1 although this is not consistent with other data

=== Nucleo-cytoplasmic regulation of transcription factors ===
CKIα or CKIδ is essential in modulating the nuclear export of eukaryotic translation initiation factor 6 (eIF6), a protein with essential nuclear and cytoplasmic roles in biogenesis of the 60S subunit of the eukaryotic ribosome. Phosphorylation of Ser-174 and Ser-175 by CKI promotes nuclear export of eIF6 while dephosphorylation by calcineurin promotes nuclear accumulation of eIF6. It is unclear whether the same mechanism is responsible for eIF6 cycling in yeast and if other kinases also play roles in these processes.

CKI homologs are also implicated in cytoplasmic shuttling of nuclear factor of activated T-cells (NFAT) through observation that the transcription factor Crz1p is phosphorylated by a CKI homolog in yeast.

=== Interphase, mitosis and DNA repair ===
CKIδ activity is implicated in mitosis and in response to DNA damage. During interphase, CKIδ associates with the Golgi Apparatus and appears to regulate the budding of clathrin coated vesicles from the TGN; it also appears to associate with tubulin. While undamaged mitotic cells shows no CKIδ association with tubulin, the kinase was recruited during mitosis in cells with DNA damage, indicative of a role for CKIδ in arranging the microtubule network during mitosis. The mechanisms for these biochemical interactions remain unknown.

== See also ==
- Casein kinase 2 — a distinct protein kinase family
