= CSNK1D =

Protein-coding gene in humans

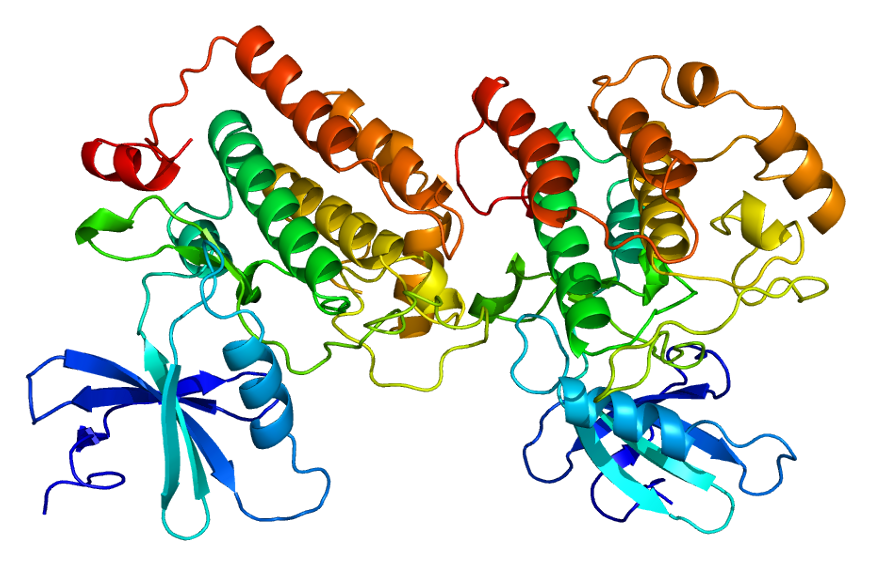

Identifiers
- Aliases: CSNK1D, ASPS, CKIdelta, FASPS2, HCKID, casein kinase 1 delta, CKId, CKI-delta
- External IDs: OMIM: 600864; MGI: 1355272; GeneCards: CSNK1D
Available structures
| PDB | Ortholog search: PDBe RCSB |
| PDB | List of PDB id codes 3UYS, 3UYT, 3UZP, 4HGT, 4HNF, 4KB8, 4KBA, 4KBC, 4KBK, 4TW9, 4TWC, 4TN6, 5IH6, 5IH5, 5IH4 |
Enzyme activity
| EC # | BRENDA | ExPASy | KEGG | MetaCyc |
|---|---|---|---|---|
| 2.7.11.1 | ↗ | ↗ | ↗ | ↗ |
| 2.7.11.26 | ↗ | ↗ | ↗ | ↗ |

Gene location (Human)
| Chr. | Chromosome 17 (human) |
| Band | 17q25.3 | Start | 82,239,023 bp |
| Band | 17q25.3 | End | 82,273,700 bp |

Gene location (Mouse)
| Chr. | Chromosome 11 (mouse) |
| Band | 11|11 E2 | Start | 120,849,816 bp |
| Band | 11|11 E2 | End | 120,882,156 bp |
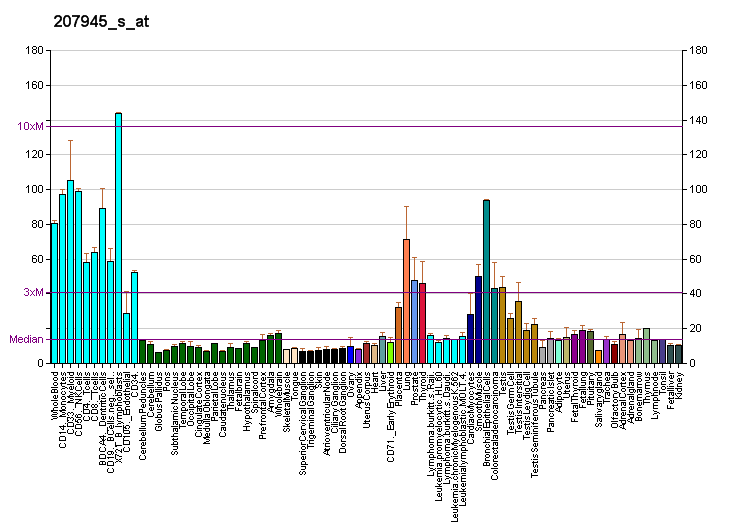

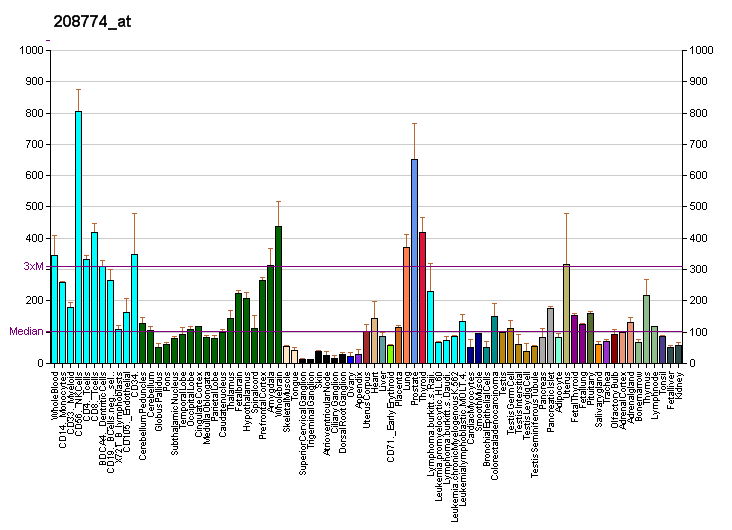
RNA expression pattern
| Bgee | Human / Mouse (ortholog); Top expressed in: left testis; right testis; granulocyte; left uterine tube; anterior pituitary; left lobe of thyroid gland; minor salivary glands; gastric mucosa; right lung; right lobe of thyroid gland / Top expressed in: Paneth cell; fossa; condyle; retinal pigment epithelium; vestibular membrane of cochlear duct; ciliary body; motor neuron; renal corpuscle; trigeminal ganglion; endothelial cell of lymphatic vessel; More reference expression data |
| BioGPS | More reference expression data |
Gene ontology
| Molecular function | transferase activity; protein kinase activity; nucleotide binding; peptide binding; kinase activity; tau-protein kinase activity; ATP binding; protein serine/threonine kinase activity; cadherin binding; protein binding |
| Cellular component | cytoplasm; cytosol; Golgi apparatus; membrane; plasma membrane; spindle; microtubule organizing center; spindle microtubule; perinuclear region of cytoplasm; neuron projection; endoplasmic reticulum-Golgi intermediate compartment membrane; cytoskeleton; Golgi membrane; nucleus; centrosome; nucleoplasm |
| Biological process | cellular response to nerve growth factor stimulus; positive regulation of protein phosphorylation; Golgi organization; phosphorylation; rhythmic process; positive regulation of canonical Wnt signaling pathway; circadian regulation of gene expression; spindle assembly; positive regulation of Wnt signaling pathway; COPII vesicle coating; G2/M transition of mitotic cell cycle; regulation of circadian rhythm; peptidyl-serine phosphorylation; protein localization to cilium; protein localization to Golgi apparatus; protein localization to centrosome; positive regulation of non-canonical Wnt signaling pathway; positive regulation of proteasomal ubiquitin-dependent protein catabolic process; microtubule nucleation; regulation of cell shape; endocytosis; rRNA processing; Wnt signaling pathway; ciliary basal body-plasma membrane docking; positive regulation of Wnt-mediated midbrain dopaminergic neuron differentiation; non-motile cilium assembly; protein phosphorylation; regulation of G2/M transition of mitotic cell cycle; peptidyl-threonine phosphorylation |
Sources:Amigo / QuickGO
Orthologs
| Databases | NCBI: entry; OMA: entry |
| Species | Human | Mouse |
| Entrez | 1453 | 104318 |
| Ensembl | ENSG00000141551 | ENSMUSG00000025162 |
| UniProt | P48730 | Q9DC28 |
| RefSeq (mRNA) | NM_001893; NM_139062; NM_001363749 | NM_027874; NM_139059 |
| RefSeq (protein) | NP_001884; NP_620693; NP_001350678 | NP_082150; NP_620690 |
| Location (UCSC) | Chr 17: 82.24 – 82.27 Mb | Chr 11: 120.85 – 120.88 Mb |
| PubMed search |
- Wikidata
| View/Edit Human | View/Edit Mouse |

Casein kinase I isoform delta also known as CKI-delta or CK1δ is an enzyme that in humans is encoded by the gene CSNK1D, which is located on chromosome 17 (17q25.3). It is a member of the CK1 (formerly named casein kinase 1) family of serine/threonine specific eukaryotic protein kinases encompassing seven distinct isoforms (CK1α, γ1-3, δ, ε) as well as various post-transcriptionally processed splice variants (transcription variants, TVs) in mammalians. Meanwhile, CK1δ homologous proteins have been isolated from organisms like yeast, basidiomycetes, plants, algae, and protozoa.

== Genetic coding ==
In 1993, the gene sequence of CK1δ was initially described by Graves et al. who isolated the cDNA from testicles of rats. After sequencing and characterization of the gene, the construct was described as a 1284 nucleotide sequence resulting in a protein consisting of 428 amino acids after transcription. The molecular weight of the according protein was published as 49 kDa. Three years later, the same gene was identified in humans. The human CSNK1D contains 1245 nucleotides and is transcribed into a protein consisting of 415 amino acids.

Ever since, CK1δ was investigated and described in various animals, plants, as well as parasites (Caenorhabditis elegans, 1998; Drosophila melanogaster, 1998; Mus musculus, 2002; Xenopus laevis, 2002.)

=== Transcriptional variants ===
So far, three different transcription variants (TVs) have been described for CK1δ in humans (Homo sapiens), mice (Mus musculus), and rats (Rattus norvegicus), which are highly homologous. The alignment of all CK1δ sequences of all organisms shows a high homology in the first 399 amino acids, except for position 381. While the human transcription variants are using isoleucine, the mouse and rat sequences incorporate a valine instead. The only exception is rat TV3, which is also transcribing its nucleotide sequence into an isoleucine.

After position 399, three different general structures can be observed. The first variant consists of 415 amino acids across all three organisms and is called TV1 in human and rat, while the murine counterpart is named CRAa. The shortest group of sequences consists of 409 amino acids: TV2 in humans and rats, CRAc in mice. The longest variant consists of 428 amino acids in rat (TV3) and mice (CRAb), while the human (TV3) variant is missing the second to last amino acid (threonine), resulting in a protein of a length of 427 amino acids.

The various transcription variants are based on a different usage of the exons that are encoding for CSNK1D. The whole gene consists of eleven different exons and is located in humans on chromosome 17 at position 17q25.3. CSNK1D has a length of 35kb and is overlapping with the gene Slc16a3. The intersecting part is exon 11, which is located downstream of exon 10. However, it does not interfere with Slc16a3 since it is located in a non-coding area.

TV1 and TV2 were postulated during an early analysis of human and murine genes in 2002. Both transcription variants share the first 399 amino acids, but differ at the following 16 amino acids for TV1 and ten amino acids for TV2, respectively. This is linked to the exon usage. While they share the first eight exons, TV1 is using exon 10and TV2 exon 9 to finish their respective sequence. The third transcription variant was postulated after a data bank analysis in the year 2014. The proposed sequence is sharing the first 399 amino acids with TV1 and TV2, but differs in the upcoming 28 amino acids. The exon usage of TV3 consists of exon 1 to 8, which is followed by exon 11 to finish the sequence.

Besides various sequences of the three different transcription variants, the variants also show differences in Michaelis-Menten kinetic parameters (K_{m} and V_{max}) in regard to their potential to phosphorylate canonical (α-casein) as well as non-canonical (GST-β-catenin^{1-181}) substrates (Xu et al., 2019). TV3 shows an increase of phosphorylation of both substrates compared to TV1 and TV2, which is statistically significant. These differences can be explained by various degrees of autophosphorylation of the transcription variants.

=== Polyadenylation ===
Based on software analysis of the mRNA sequences various polyadenylation patterns could be identified for the transcription variants . TV1 and TV2 share the same pattern located on exon 10 starting at position 1246 resulting in a 32 nucleotide motif (AGUAGAGUCUGCGCUGUGACCUUCUGUUGGGC). TV3 uses a motif on exon 11 at the position 320. The motif is also 32 nucleotides long, but differs from the sequence used by TV1/2 (AGUGGCUUGUUCCACCUCAGCUCCCAUCUAAC). The difference in the polyadenylation sequence results in a variance of the minimum free energy values of the predicted RNA folding structures (-28.70 kcal/mol, TV1 and TV2 and -16.03 kcal/mol, TV3), which could result in different length of the Poly-A tail. Based on the observation that stable secondary structures result in decreased polyadenylation of the specific site, this might indicate that TV1 and TV2 are less polyadenylated in comparison to TV3.

== Structure ==
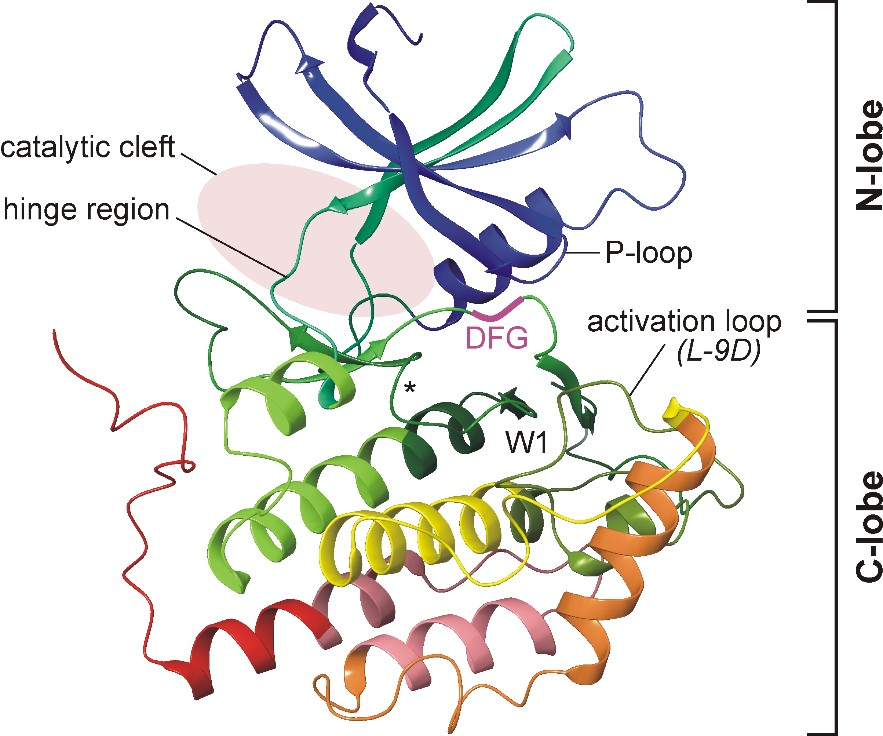
Figure 1: Three-dimensional structure of human CK1δ. While the structure of the N-lobe mainly consists of β-sheet strands, the larger C-terminal lobe is mainly composed by α-helices and loop structures. The DFG motif is located within loop L-89. A recognition motif for the binding of phosphorylated substrates has been identified by detection of a tungstate-binding domain, indicated by W1. The position of the catalytic loop (L-67) is marked with the asterisk. The figure was created by using CK1δ crystallization data created by Ben-neriah et al., deposited in the protein data bank (PDB) with ID 6GZM.

Like eukaryotic protein kinases (ePKs) the different isoforms of the CK1 family consist of a N-terminal and a C-terminal lobe (N- and C-lobe, respectively), which are connected via a hinge region. While the N-lobe is mainly composed by β-sheet strands, the larger C-lobe predominantly consists of α-helical and loop structures. Between both lobes a catalytic cleft is formed, accommodating substrates and ATP for the kinase reaction.

=== Binding of substrates and co-substrates ===
Binding of phosphorylated substrates to distinct regions of the C-lobe has previously been detected by binding of a tungstate derivative (as a phosphate analog). Instead of phospho-primed substrate also the C-terminal regulatory domain of CK1δ is able to bind to this position for the purpose of autoregulatory function. Binding of ATP is mainly mediated via the glycine-rich P-loop (L-12, bridging strands β1 and β2), forming the top cover of the WTP binding site, and the so-called catalytic loop (L-67). Conformational changes affecting the activation loop (L-9D) are related to regulation of kinase activity. When the activation loop moves out of the catalytic site the catalytically relevant DFG motif (Asp-149, Phe-150, and Gly-151) shifts to an internal position. The aspartate residue chelates a Mg^{2+} ion allowing proper binding and orientation of ATP. Another residue, which is essentially involved in the regulation of kinase activity, but also in forming interactions with small molecule inhibitors, is Met-82, the so-called gatekeeper residue. Directly located within the ATP binding pocket this residue controls access of small molecules to certain binding pockets (selectivity pockets) located beyond the position of the gatekeeper.

=== Additional functional domains ===
Apart from domains directly involved in catalytic activity further functional domains are present in the CK1δ protein. A kinesin homology domain (KHD) as well as a putative dimerization domain (DD) can be found in the kinase domain. While the KHD allows CK1 isoforms to interact with components of the cytoskeleton. the DD is supposed to be involved in regulation of kinase activity (see below). In the C-lobe, furthermore, a nuclear localization signal (NLS) as well as a centrosome localization signal (CLS) can be found. However, the first one is not sufficient to locate CK1δ to the nucleus.

== Regulation of expression and activity ==
Rigorous control of CK1δ expression and kinase activity is crucial due to its involvement in important cellular signal transduction pathways. Generally, basal expression levels of CK1δ differ between various tissues, cell types, and physiological circumstances. Increased expression levels of CK1δ mRNA can be detected after treatment of cells with DNA-damaging substances, like etoposide and camptothecin, or by γ-irradiation, while increased CK1-specific activity is observed after stimulation of cells with insulin or after viral transformation.

=== Subcellular sequestration ===
On protein level, CK1δ activity can be regulated by sequestration to particular subcellular compartments bringing the kinase together with distinct pools of substrates in order to guide its cellular function. This sequestration is usually facilitated by scaffolding proteins, which are also supposed to allosterically control the activity of the interacting kinase. For CK1δ subcellular sequestration has been described to be mediated by A-kinase anchor protein (AKAP) 450, the X-linked DEAD-box RNA helicase 3 (DDX3X), casein kinase-1 binding protein (CK1BP), and the regulatory and complex-building/-initiating molecule 14-3-3 ζ. AKAP450 recruits CK1δ and ε to the centrosome to exert centrosome-specific functions in the context of cell cycle regulation. DDX3X promotes CK1ε-mediated phosphorylation of Dishevelled (Dvl) in the canonical Wnt pathway but has also been demonstrated to stimulate CK1δ- and ε-specific kinase activity by up to five orders of magnitude. On the contrary, proteins being homologous to CK1BP (e.g. dysbindin or BLOC-1 [biogenesis of lysosome-related organelles complex-1]) are able to inhibit CK1δ kinase activity in a dose dependent manner.

=== Dimerization ===
Dimerization of CK1δ has also been described as a regulatory mechanism through the interaction interface contained by the DD of CK1δ. Following dimerization, Arg-13 inserts into the adenine binding pocket and prevents binding of ATP and perhaps also of large substrates. Although CK1δ in solution is always purified as monomers, biological relevance of dimerization could be demonstrated by showing that the binding of dominant-negative mutant CK1δ to wild type CK1δ resulted in the total reduction of CK1δ-specific kinase activity.

=== Site-specific phosphorylation ===
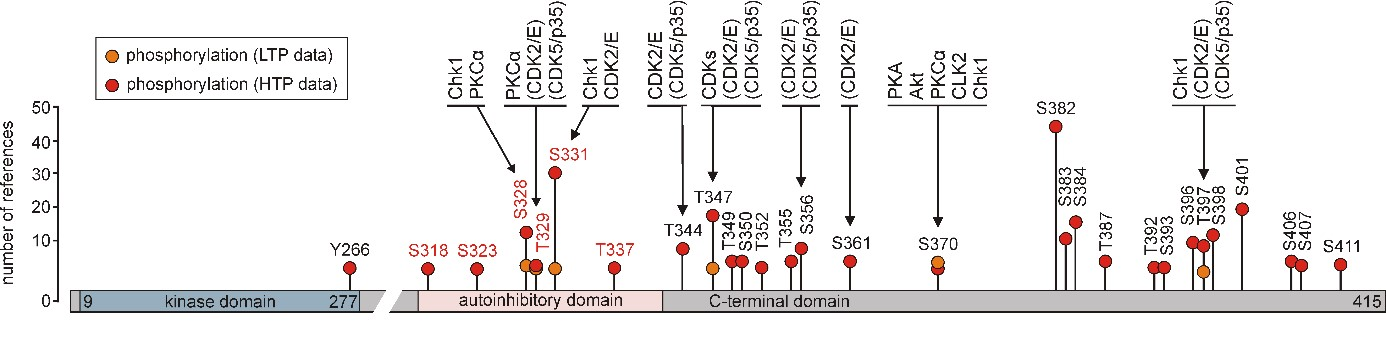
Figure 2: Posttranslational modification of human CK1δ. Identified posttranslational modifications of CK1δ TV1 are indicated at their reported positions. Because most modifications have been reported for the C-terminal domain, this domain is depictured in a stretched presentation compared to the kinase domain. In the case of phosphorylation the distinction is made between reports of low-throughput studies (LTP) and high-throughput studies (HTP). Autophosphorylated residues within the autoinhibitory domain are shown in red. Kinases identified to phosphorylate certain residues are indicated above the respective target site. Names of kinases are parenthesized in case final confirmation is pending. Information about detected ubiquitylation, acetylation, and methylation events is also provided, although up to now no specific functions have been linked to the observed modifications. The figure was created based on information provided for CK1δ by PhosphoSitePlus.

Posttranslational modifications, especially site-specific phosphorylation mediated either by upstream kinases or by intramolecular autophosphorylation, have been demonstrated to reversibly modulate CK1δ kinase activity. Several residues within the C-terminal regulatory domain of CK1δ were identified as targets for autophosphorylation, including Ser-318, Thr-323, Ser-328, Thr-329, Ser-331, and Thr-337. Upon autophosphorylation sequence motifs within the C-terminal domain are generated, which are able to block the catalytic center of the kinase by acting as a pseudosubstrate. Regulatory function of the C-terminal domain has furthermore been confirmed by the observation that kinase activity is increased after proteolytic cleavage of this domain.

Besides autophosphorylation, site-specific phosphorylation by other cellular kinases has been demonstrated to regulate kinase activity. So far, C-terminal phosphorylation of CK1δ by upstream kinases has been confirmed for protein kinase A (PKA), protein kinase B (Akt), cyclin-dependent kinase 2/cyclin E (CDK2/E) and cyclin-dependent kinase 5/p35 (CDK5/p35), CDC-like kinase 2 (CLK2), protein kinase C α (PKCα), and checkpoint kinase 1 (Chk1). For several phosphorylation events also effects on kinase function have been described. For residue Ser-370, which can be phosphorylated at least by PKA, Akt, CLK2, PKCα and Chk1, major regulatory function has been demonstrated. As a consequence of altered kinase activity of a CK1δ S370A mutant, subsequently affected Wnt/β-catenin signal transduction resulted in development of an ectopic dorsal axis in Xenopus laevis embryos. Further residues targeted by site-specific phosphorylation are depicted in Figure 2. Mutation of identified target sites to the non-posphorylatable amino acid alanine leads to significant effects on catalytic parameters of CK1δ in most cases, at least in vitro.

Evidence was also generated in cell culture-based analyses, which show reduced CK1-specific kinase activity after activation of cellular Chk1, and increased activity of CK1 after treatment of cells with the PKC-specific inhibitor Gö-6983 or the pan-CDK inhibitor dinaciclib. These findings indicate, that site-specific phosphorylation mediated by Chk1, PKCα, and CDKs actually results in reduced cellular CK1-specific kinase activity. However, robust in vivo phosphorylation data are missing in most cases and biological relevance and functional consequences of site-specific phosphorylation remains to be investigated for in vivo conditions. Moreover, phosphorylation target sites within the kinase domain have not been extensively characterized yet and are object to future research.

== Substrates ==
So far, more than 150 proteins have been identified to be targets for CK1-mediated phosphorylation, at least in vitro. Phosphorylation of numerous substrates is enabled due to the existence of several consensus motifs, which can be recognized by CK1 isoforms.

=== Canonical consensus motif ===
CK1δ preferably interacts with phospho-primed or acidic substrates due to the localization of positively charged amino acids (e.g. Arg-178 and Lys-224) in the region involved in substrate recognition. The canonical consensus motif targeted by CK1 is represented by the sequence pSer/pThr-X-X-(X)-Ser/Thr. In this motif X stands for any amino acid while pSer/pThr indicates a previously phosphorylated serine or threonine residue. CK1-mediated phosphorylation occurs at the Ser/Thr downstream of the phospho-primed residue. However, instead of a primed residue also a cluster of negatively charged amino acid residues (Asp or Glu) can be included in the canonical consensus motif.

=== Non-canonical consensus motif ===
As a first non-canonical consensus motif targeted by CK1δ the so-called SLS motif (Ser-Leu-Ser) has been described, which can be found in β-catenin and nuclear factor of activated T-cells (NFAT). In several sulfatide and cholesterol-3-sulfate (SCS)-binding proteins the consensus motif Lys/Arg-X-Lys/Arg-X-X-Ser/Thr has been identified and phosphorylation of this motif has been demonstrated for myelin basic protein (MBP), the Ras homolog family member A (RhoA), and tau.

== Subcellular localization ==
Within living cells CK1δ can be detected in both, the cytoplasm and the nucleus, and increased levels of CK1δ can be found in close proximity to the Golgi apparatus and the trans Golgi network (TGN). Temporarily, CK1δ can also be localized to membranes, receptors, transport vesicles, components of the cytoskeleton, centrosomes or spindle poles. While the present NLS is not sufficient for nuclear localization of CK1δ, the presence of the kinase domain and even its enzymatic activity are needed for proper subcellular localization of CK1δ.

=== Interaction with cellular proteins ===
Localization of CK1δ to certain subcellular compartments can furthermore be initiated by its interaction with cellular proteins. In order to mediate interaction with CK1δ appropriate docking motifs need to be present in the respective proteins. Docking motif Phe-X-X-X-Phe has been identified in NFAT, β-catenin, PER, and proteins of the FAM83 family. As an example, nuclear CK1δ can be localized to nuclear speckles by its interaction with FAM83H. Another interaction motif is represented by the sequence Ser-Gln-Ile-Pro, which is present in microtubule plus-end-binding protein 1 (EB1). Numerous interaction partners for CK1δ have been described within recent years, forming strong interactions with CK1δ and therefore being more than simple substrate proteins. As mentioned above, interactions with CK1δ have been shown for AKAP450 and DDX3X. By initially performing yeast two-hybrid screens, interaction could also be confirmed for the Ran-binding protein in the microtubule-organizing center (RanBPM), microtubule-associated protein 1A, and snapin, a protein associated with neurotransmitter release in neuronal cells. Interactions with CK1δ have also been detected for the development-associated factors LEF-1 (lymphocyte enhancer factor-1) and the proneural basic helix-loop-helix (bHLH) transcription factor Atoh1. Finally, interaction of CK1δ with PER and CRY circadian clock proteins have been demonstrated, facilitating nuclear translocation of PERs and CRYs.

== Cellular functions ==
=== Circadian rhythm ===
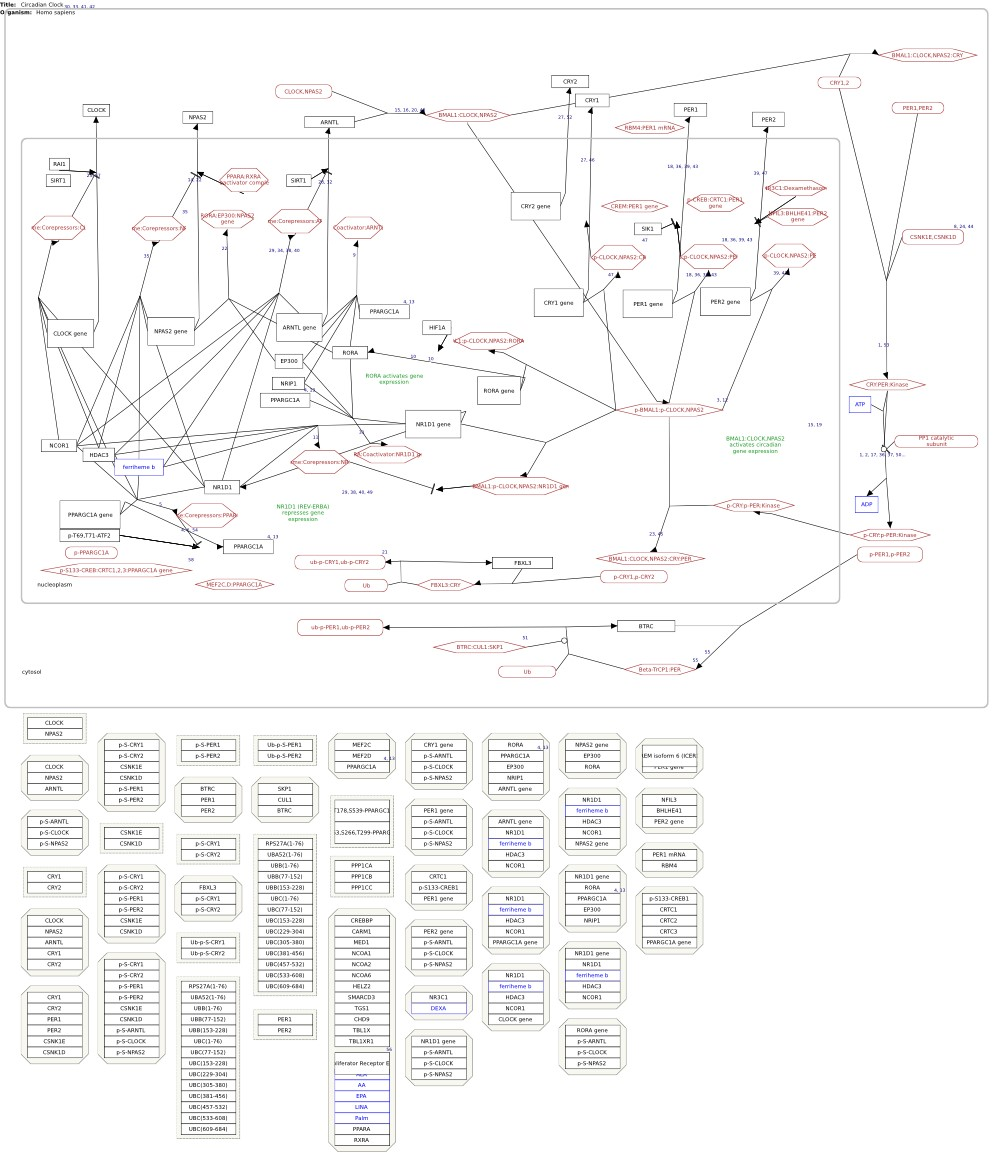
Wikipathway: Circadian Clock (Homo sapiens). Whole Pathway can be seen at: https://www.wikipathways.org/index.php/Pathway:WP1797

CK1δ seems to be involved in the circadian rhythm, the internal cellular clock, which permits a rhythm of about 24 h. The circadian rhythm mainly consists of a negative feedback loop mediated by (PER) and cryptochrome (CRY) proteins, which can dimerize and shuttle into the nucleus. Here, PER/CRY dimers can inhibit their own transcription, by inhibiting the CLOCK/BMAL1-responsive gene transcription. Alteration of normal circadian rhythm has been observed in different diseases, among them neurological and sleeping disorders. In the nucleus, CK1δ can further inhibit CLOCK/BMAL1-driven transcription by reducing their binding activity to DNA. Moreover, CK1δ/ε can phosphorylate PER proteins and influence their further degradation. Destabilization of the circadian rhythm can be observed after inhibition of PER phosphorylation by CK1δ/ε. In fact, alterations in CK1δ activity lead to changes in the length of the circadian rhythm.

=== DNA damage and cellular stress ===
CK1δ can be also activated by genotoxic stress and DNA damage in a p53-dependent manner, and phosphorylate key regulatory proteins in response to these processes. CK1δ phosphorylates human p53 on Ser-6, Ser-9, and Ser-20. Moreover, CK1δ phosphorylates p53 on Thr-18, once p53 is already phospho-primed, permitting a lower p53-Mdm2 binding and higher p53 activity. Under normal conditions, CK1δ can phosphorylate Mdm2 on Ser-240, Ser-242, Ser-246, and Ser-383, permitting higher p53-Mdm2 stability and further p53 degradation. On the contrary, after DNA damage, ATM phosphorylates CK1δ, which can subsequently phosphorylate Mdm2 inducing its proteasomal degradation. Under hypoxia, CK1δ is involved in reducing cell proliferation by interfering with HIF-1α/ARNT complex formation. Additionally, the activity of topoisomerase II α (TOPOII-α), one of the main regulators of DNA replication, results increased after its CK1δ-mediated phosphorylation on Ser-1106. Under stress conditions, CK1δ can interfere with DNA replication. In fact, CK1δ phosphorylates a main regulator of DNA methylation, the ubiquitin-like containing PHD and RING finger domains 1 protein (UHRF1), on Ser-108, increasing its proteasomal degradation.

=== Cell cycle, mitosis and meiosis ===
CK1δ is involved in microtubule dynamics, cell cycle progression, genomic stability, mitosis and meiosis. Transient mitotic arrest, can be observed after CK1δ inhibition with IC261, even though this inhibitor have recently been shown not to be CK1-specific and to have many additional off-target Nevertheless, in line with these results, CK1δ inhibition or silencing allows Wee1 stability and subsequent Cdk1 phosphorylation which permits cell cycle exit. Absence of CK1δ has been also associated with genomic instability. Nevertheless, the role of CK1δ in mitosis is still unclear and contrary reports have been published.

CK1δ seems also to be involved in meiosis. Hrr25, the CK1δ orthologue in Saccharomyces cerevisiae, can be found localized to P-bodies – RNA/protein granules identified in cytoplasm of meiotic cells – and seems to be necessary for meiosis progression. Furthermore, Hrr25 was observed to have a role in nuclear division and membrane synthesis during meiosis II. In Schizosaccharomyces pombe, the CK1δ/ε orthologue Hhp2 promotes the cleavage of cohesion protein Rec8 possibly after its phosphorylation during meiosis. Moreover, phosphorylation of STAG3, the mammalian orthologue of Rec11, by CK1 could be also observed, confirming a possible conservation of this process also in mammals.

=== Cytoskeleton associated functions ===
CK1δ is involved in the regulation of microtubule polymerization and stability of the spindle apparatus and centrosomes during mitosis by directly phosphorylating α-, β-, and γ-tubulin. Additionally, CK1δ can also phosphorylate microtubule-associated proteins (MAPs) thereby influencing their interaction with microtubules as well as microtubule dynamics.

=== Developmental pathways ===
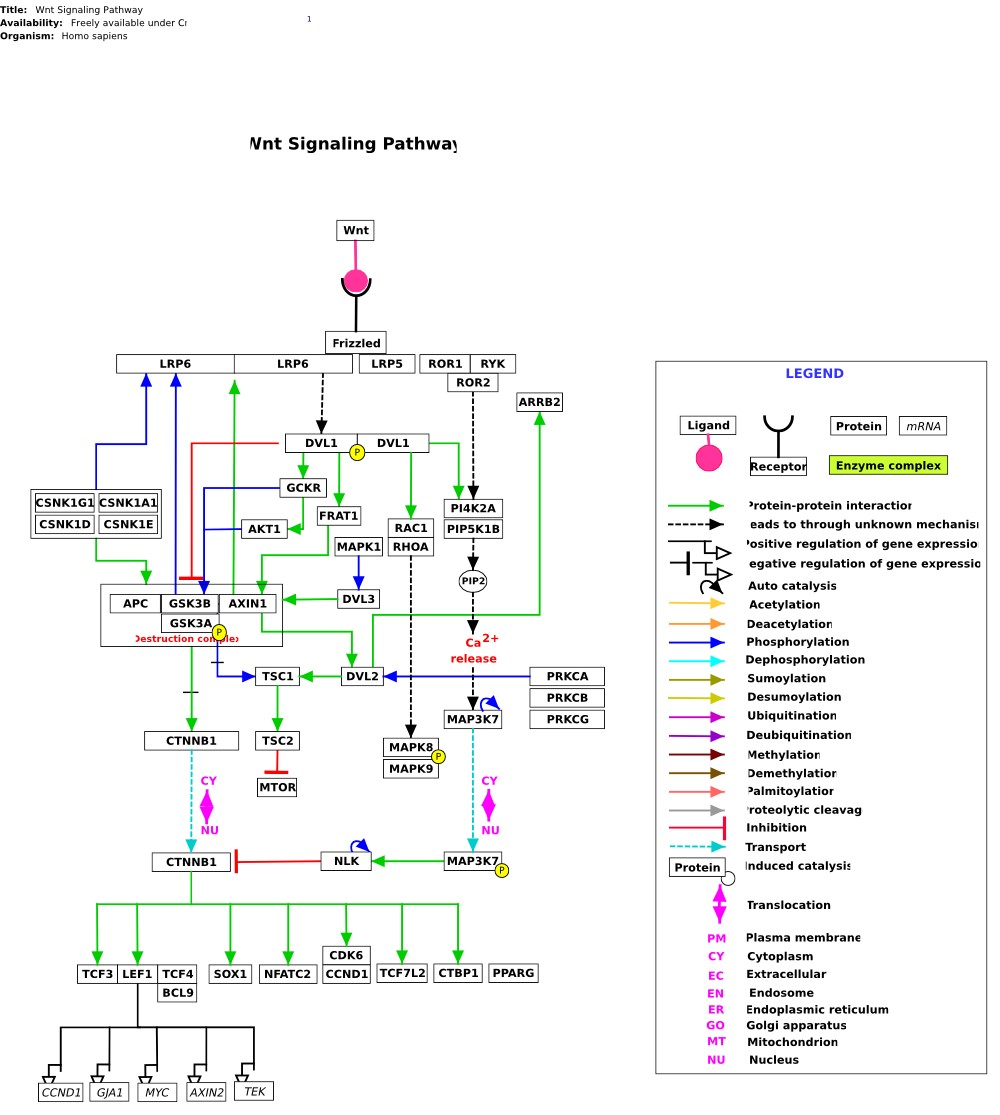
Wikipathways: Wnt Signaling Pathway (Homo sapiens). Whole Pathway can be seen at: https://www.wikipathways.org/index.php/Pathway:WP363

CK1δ is involved in different developmental pathways, among them Wingless (Wnt)-, Hedgehog (Hh)-, and Hippo (Hpo)-pathways. In the Wnt pathway, CK1δ can phosphorylate different factors of the pathway, among them Dishevelled (Dvl), Axin, APC, and β-catenin. CK1δ also negatively influences the stability of β-catenin, after its phosphorylation on Ser-45, which permits GSK3β-mediated further phosphorylations and subsequent degradation.

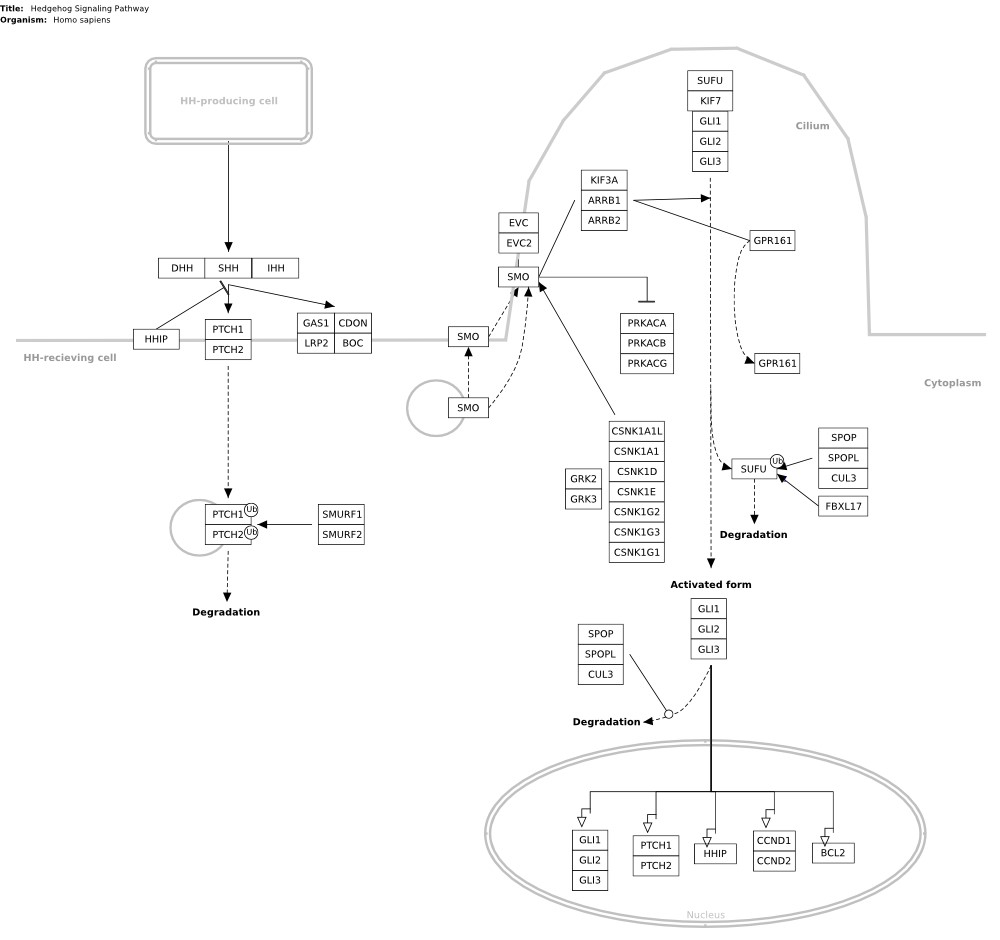
Wikipathways: Hedgehog Signaling Pathway (Homo sapiens). Whole Pathway can be seen at: https://www.wikipathways.org/index.php/Pathway:WP4249

In the Hh pathway, CK1δ can phosphorylate Smothened (Smo) thereby enhancing its activity. Moreover, its additional role in this signaling pathways is still controversial. In fact, on one hand CK1δ can phosphorylate Cubitus interruptus activator (CiA) thereby avoiding its proteasomal degradation, while on the other hand CK1δ-mediated phosphorylation of Ci can increase its ubiquitination and its partial proteolysis into the repressive form of Ci (CiR).

In the Hpo pathway, CK1δ can phosphorylate yes-associated protein (YAP), the down-stream co-activator of Hpo-responsive gene transcription on Ser-381, which influences its proteasomal degradation. Moreover, the Hpo signaling pathway seems to be related with both, Wnt signaling. and p53 regulation In presence of Wnt ligand, CKδ/ε can phosphorylate the key Wnt-effector Dishevelled (Dvl) which inhibits the β-catenin destruction complex finally resulting in a higher stability of β-catenin. Here, YAP/Tafazzin (TAZ) can bind Dvl and reducing its CK1δ-mediated phosphorylation. Additionally, β-catenin can be retained into the cytoplasm after binding to YAP, which results in lower transcription of Wnt-responsive genes.

== Clinical significance ==
Within this section, the function of CK1δ in the occurrence, development and progress of several diseases and disorders mainly on cancers, neurological diseases and metabolic diseases will be discussed.

=== Carcinogenesis ===
Deregulation of CK1δ contributes to tumorigenesis and tumor progression through deregulation of Wnt/β-catenin-, p53-, Hedgehog-, and Hippo-related signaling. CK1δ mRNA is overexpressed in various cancer entities, among them bladder cancer, brain cancer, breast cancer, colorectal cancer, kidney cancer, lung adenocarcinoma, melanoma, ovarian cancer, pancreatic cancer, prostate cancer, hematopoietic malignancies and lymphoid neoplasms. Also decreased CK1δ mRNA expression levels have been observed in some cancer studies, like urinary bladder cancer, lung squamous cell carcinoma, stomach cancer, kidney cancer, esophageal cancer as well as head and neck cancer. Besides those, reduced CK1δ activity owing to the site N172D mutation of CK1δ decelerated mammary carcinoma progression, and prolonged mouse survival in a transgenic mouse model. The two CK1δ mutations, R324H and T67S identified in intestinal mucosa and in a colorectal tumor, respectively, exhibit increased carcinogenic potential.

=== Neuropathy and neurological diseases ===
Abnormal expression of CK1δ in brain tissue has been found in many diseases by immunohistochemistry and gene expression studies, like Alzheimer's disease, Down syndrome, progressive supranuclear palsy, parkinsonism dementia complex of Guam (PDC), Pick's disease, pallido-ponto-nigral degeneration (PPND) and Familial advanced sleep phase syndrome.

In typical pathological tissues neuritic plaques (NPs) or granulovacuolar degeneration bodies (GVBs) of AD show high expression of CK1δ, whereas in neurofibrillary tangles (NFTs) expression of CK1δ is low. The AD hallmark proteins tau in NFTs or GVBs and TAR DNA-binding protein of 43 kDa (TDP-43) in GVBs colocalize with CK1δ. In vitro phosphorylation studies revealed that several sites within tau and TDP-43 were phosphorylated by CK1δ. Reduction of site-specific phosphorylation of TDP-43 by inhibition of CK1δ in both, a neuronal cell model as well as in a Drosophila model resulted in prevention of neurotoxicity and consequently to rescue of cells from cell death. Based on these studies, CK1δ could be recognized as a hallmark as well as a potential target for AD treatment and may be further useful for diagnostic and therapeutic purpose in the future. In addition, CK1δ plays a regulatory role in Parkinson's disease (PD) by phosphorylating α-synuclein. Familial advanced sleep phase syndrome (FASPS) is another neurological disease associated with CK1δ-mediated phosphorylation of the mammalian clock protein PER2. After site-specific phosphorylation by CK1δ, the stability of PER2 is increased and half-life of PER2 is expanded. Furthermore, PER2 stability can be influenced by CK1δ T344A mutation and site-specific phosphorylation of CK1δ at Thr-347 by other intracellular kinases.

=== Obesity-related metabolic disorders ===
CK1δ may affect metabolic dysfunction especially in obese situation by improving glucose tolerance, decreasing gluconeogenesis gene expression and glucose secretion or increasing basal and insulin-stimulated glucose uptake. Furthermore, formation of the biologically active higher molecular weight (HMW) form of adiponectin, which is involved in regulating glucose levels and fatty acid secreted from adipose tissue, is modulated by site-specific phosphorylation of adiponectin by CK1δ.

=== Parasitic CK1s hijack mammalian CK1 pathways ===
Increasing evidence suggests that CK1 can be associated with infectious diseases by the manipulation of the CK1-related signaling pathways of the host cell by intracellular parasites, exporting their CK1 into the host cell. For Leishmania and Plasmodium, excreted CK1 contributes to reprogramming of the respective host cells. Possessing host functions parasitic CK1s are able to replace mammalian CK1s, thereby ensuring similar functions. Parasitic CK1s display a high level of identity towards human CK1δ TV1, suggesting that this human paralogue might be the preferred target for parasitic hijacking. The protein organization of parasitic CK1s is very similar to that of human CK1δ. All residues involved in ATP binding, the gatekeeper residue, as well as the DFG, KHD, and SIN motifs are generally conserved in parasitic CK1 sequences. This finding suggests, that they are crucial for CK1 function. However, the functions of these kinases in the parasites and more importantly their functions in the host cell are mainly unknown and remain to be investigated. CK1s from Plasmodium and Leishmania are most studied:

- The only CK1 in Plasmodium, PfCK1 (PF3D7_1136500), presents 69% of identity with human CK1 within the kinase domain and is essential for completion of the asexual intra-erythrocytic cycle. Similar to other CK1s, also PfCK1 has multiple binding partners and thus potentially regulates multiple pathways, including those regulating transcription, translation, and protein trafficking. Finally, PfCK1 seems to be essential for parasite proliferation in erythrocytes.
- From the six CK1 paralogues in Leishmania donovani only two paralogs, LdBPK_351020.1 and LdBPK_351030.1 (LmCK1.2), are closely related to human CK1. The only paralog described as having a function in the host cell. LdBPK_351030.1 is active in both promastigotes and amastigotes. LmCK1.2 can be inhibited by the CK1-specific inhibitor D4476 and is important for intracellular parasite survival. So far, only few substrates for LmCK1.2 have been identified and the functions of LmCK1.2 in the parasite are poorly studied. Although LmCK1.2 is highly identic to human CK1, several small molecules have been identified to specifically target Leishmania CK1, thereby providing opportunities for new therapeutic strategies.

== Modulating CK1δ activity ==
Due to the fact that CK1δ is involved in regulation of various cellular processes there is high attempts to influence its activity. Since changes of the expression and/or activity as well as the occurrence of mutations within the coding sequence of CK1δ account to the development of various diseases, among them cancer and neurodegenerative diseases like AD, ALS, PD and sleeping disorders, most interest has first concentrated on the development of CK1δ specific small molecule inhibitors (SMIs). Due to the fact, that CK1δ mutants isolated from different tumor entities often exhibit a higher oncogenic potential than wild type CK1δ there are also great efforts to generate SMIs which are more selective inhibiting CK1δ mutants than wild type CK1δ. These SMIs would be of high clinical interest as they would increase the therapeutic window and reduce therapeutic side effects for the treatment of proliferative and neurodegenerative diseases. However, development of CK1δ specific inhibitors is very challenging due to several reasons: (i) So far, most of the developed inhibitors are classified as ATP-competitive inhibitors exhibiting off target effects mainly due to structural similarities of the ATPbinding site of CK1δ to those of other kinases and ATP-binding proteins, (ii) site specific phosphorylation of CK1δ, especially within its C-terminal regulatory domain, often increases the IC50 value of CK1δ specific inhibitors, and (iii) due to their hydrophobic character their bioavailability is often very low. Within the last few years several SMIs with a much higher selectivity towards CK1δ than to other CK1 isoforms have been described which are also effective in animal models. Treatment of rats, mice, monkeys and zebrafishes with PF-670462 (4-[3-cyclohexyl-5-(4-fluoro-phenyl)-3H-imidazol-4-yl]-pyrimidin-2-ylamine) results in a phase shift in circadian rhythm. Furthermore, it blocks amphetamine-induced locomotion in rats, prevents the alcohol deprivation effect in rat, and inhibits acute and chronic bleomycin-induced pulmonary fibrosis in mice. PF-670462 also stalls deterioration caused by UVB eye irradiation in a mouse model of ulcerative colitis, and reduces the accumulation of leukemic cells in the peripheral blood and spleen in a mouse model for Chronic lymphocytic leukemia (CLL). PF-5006739, 4-[4-(4-fluorophenyl)-1-(piperidin-4-yl)-1H-imidazol-5-yl]pyrimidin-2-amine derivative attenuate the opioid drug-seeking behavior in rodents. Furthermore, it leads to a phase delay of circadian rhythm in nocturnal and diurnal animal models. N-benzothiazolyl-2-phenyl acetamide derivatives developed by Salado and co-workers show protective effects on in vivo hTDP-43 neurotoxicity in Drosophila.

Interestingly, inhibitors of Wnt production (IWPs), known to inhibit O-acyltransferase porcupine (Porcn) and to be antagonists of the Wnt pathway, show structural similarities to benzimidazole-based CK1 inhibitors, among them Bischof-5 and are therefore highly potent in specifically inhibiting CK1δ. Further development of IWP derivatives resulted in improved IWP-based ATP-competitive inhibitors of CK1δ. In summary, it can be concluded that the cellular effects mediated by IWPs are not only due to the inhibition of Porcn, but also to inhibition of CK1δ dependent signaling pathways. These data clearly show a high potential of CK1δ specific inhibitors for personalized therapy concepts for the treatment of various tumor entities (e.g. breast cancer, colorectal cancer, and glioblastoma), leukemia, neurodegenerative disease like AD, PD, and ALs, and sleeping disorders. Furthermore, CK1δ specific inhibitors seem to exhibit high relevance for prognostic applications. In this context [^{11}C] labeled highly potent difluoro-dioxolo-benzoimidazol-benzamides can be used as PET radiotracers and for imaging of AD.

Since small molecule inhibitors often have various disadvantages, including low bioavailability, off-target effects as well as severe side effects, the interest in the development and validation of new biological tools like identification of biological active peptides either able to inhibit CK1δ activity or the interaction of CK1δ with cellular proteins is more and more growing. The use of peptide libraries resulted in the identification of peptides able to specifically block the interaction of CK1δ with tubulin, the RNA helicase DDX3X and Axin. Binding of peptide δ-361 to α-tubulin not only lead to blocking of the interaction of CK1δ with α-tubulin, it also selectively inhibited phosphorylation of GST-α-tubulin by CK1δ. Treatment of cancer cells with peptide δ-361 finally resulted to microtubule destabilization and cell death. Fine-mapping of the DDX3X interaction domains on CK1δ, the CK1δ- peptides δ-1, and δ-41 were identified to be able to block the interactions of CK1δ with the X-linked DEAD box RNA helicase DDX3X as well as the kinase activity of CK1δ. In addition, these two identified peptides could inhibit the stimulation of CK1 kinase activity in established cell lines. Since DDX3X mutations being present in medulloblastoma patients increase the activity of CK1 in living cells, and subsequently activate CK1-regulated pathways like Wnt/β-catenin and hedgehog signaling, the identified interaction-blocking peptides could be useful in personalized therapy concepts for the treatment of Wnt/β-catenin- or Hedgehog-driven cancers. In 2018, the interaction between Axin1, a scaffold protein exhibiting important roles in Wnt signaling, and CK1δ/ε were fine-mapped using a peptide library. The identified Axin1 derived peptides were able to block the interaction with CK1δ/ε. Since Axin1 and Dvl also compete for CK1δ/ε-mediated site-specific phosphorylation it can be stated that Axin 1 plays an important role of in balancing CK1δ/ε mediated phosphorylation of Dvl as well as for the activation of canonical Wnt signaling.

== See also ==
- Casein kinase 1 isoform epsilon
- Casein kinase 1 family
