= Casein kinase 1 isoform epsilon =

Protein and coding gene in humans

CSNK1E

Identifiers
- Aliases: CSNK1E, CKIepsilon, HCKIE, Casein kinase 1 isoform epsilon, casein kinase 1 epsilon, CKIe
- External IDs: OMIM: 600863; MGI: 1351660; GeneCards: CSNK1E
Available structures
PDB	Ortholog search: PDBe RCSB
PDB	List of PDB id codes 4HNI, 4HOK
Enzyme activity
EC #	BRENDA	ExPASy	KEGG	MetaCyc
2.7.11.1	↗	↗	↗	↗

Gene location (Human)
Chr.	Chromosome 22 (human)
Band	22q13.1	Start	38,290,691 bp
Band	22q13.1	End	38,318,084 bp

Gene location (Mouse)
Chr.	Chromosome 15 (mouse)
Band	15|15 E1	Start	79,302,056 bp
Band	15|15 E1	End	79,339,767 bp
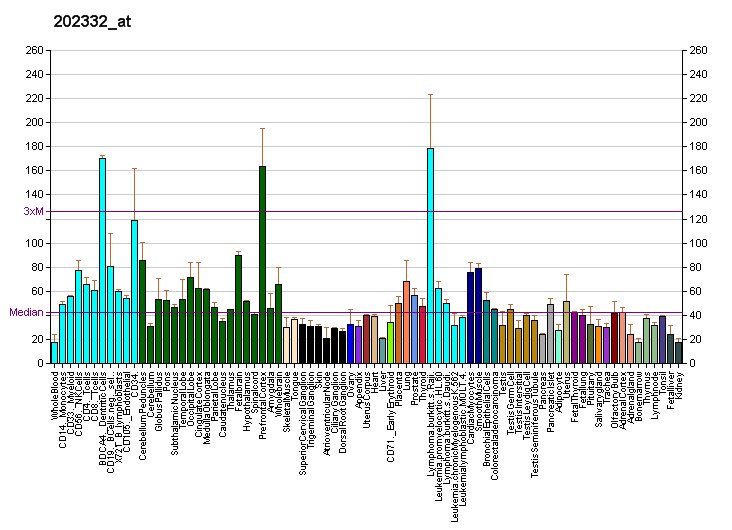
RNA expression pattern
Bgee	Human / Mouse (ortholog); Top expressed in: ganglionic eminence; left ovary; ventricular zone; right uterine tube; canal of the cervix; body of uterus; right ovary; stromal cell of endometrium; anterior pituitary; skin of leg / Top expressed in: zygote; secondary oocyte; ganglionic eminence; lip; genital tubercle; ventricular zone; medial ganglionic eminence; Rostral migratory stream; granulocyte; tail of embryo; More reference expression data
BioGPS	More reference expression data
Gene ontology
Molecular function	transferase activity; protein kinase activity; nucleotide binding; kinase activity; protein serine/threonine kinase activity; protein binding; ATP binding; RNA binding
Cellular component	cytoplasm; cytosol; nucleus; nucleoplasm; growth cone; neuron projection; soma
Biological process	phosphorylation; rhythmic process; Wnt signaling pathway; negative regulation of protein binding; protein phosphorylation; G2/M transition of mitotic cell cycle; peptidyl-serine phosphorylation; DNA repair; signal transduction; endocytosis; regulation of cell shape; rRNA processing; ciliary basal body-plasma membrane docking; positive regulation of Wnt-mediated midbrain dopaminergic neuron differentiation; positive regulation of proteasomal ubiquitin-dependent protein catabolic process; circadian regulation of gene expression; regulation of circadian rhythm; positive regulation of non-canonical Wnt signaling pathway; regulation of G2/M transition of mitotic cell cycle; circadian behavior; positive regulation of amyloid-beta formation; cellular response to nerve growth factor stimulus; peptidyl-threonine phosphorylation; canonical Wnt signaling pathway; positive regulation of canonical Wnt signaling pathway
Sources:Amigo / QuickGO
Orthologs
Databases	NCBI: entry; OMA: entry
Species	Human	Mouse
Entrez	1454	27373
Ensembl	ENSG00000213923	ENSMUSG00000022433
UniProt	P49674	Q9JMK2
RefSeq (mRNA)	NM_001894; NM_152221	NM_013767; NM_001289898; NM_001289899; NM_001359862; NM_001359863
RefSeq (protein)	NP_001885; NP_689407	NP_001276827; NP_001276828; NP_038795; NP_001346791; NP_001346792
Location (UCSC)	Chr 22: 38.29 – 38.32 Mb	Chr 15: 79.3 – 79.34 Mb
PubMed search
- Wikidata
View/Edit Human	View/Edit Mouse

Casein kinase 1, epsilon

Identifiers
- Symbol: CSNK1E
- NCBI gene: 1454
- HGNC: 2453
- OMIM: 121695
- RefSeq: NM_001894
- UniProt: P49674

Other data
- EC number: 2.7.11.1
- Locus: Chr. 22 q13.1
Search for
- Structures: Swiss-model
- Domains: InterPro

Casein kinase I isoform epsilon or CK1ε, is an enzyme that is encoded by the CSNK1E gene in humans. It is the mammalian homolog of doubletime. CK1ε is a serine/threonine protein kinase and is very highly conserved; therefore, this kinase is very similar to other members of the casein kinase 1 family, of which there are seven mammalian isoforms (α, β, γ1, γ2, γ3, δ and ε). CK1ε is most similar to CK1δ in structure and function as the two enzymes maintain a high sequence similarity on their regulatory C-terminal and catalytic domains. This gene is a major component of the mammalian oscillator which controls cellular circadian rhythms. CK1ε has also been implicated in modulating various human health issues such as cancer, neurodegenerative diseases, and diabetes.

== Discovery ==
=== CK1ε-tau Mutation ===
In hamsters, the CK1ε-tau mutation was first discovered by Michael Menaker and Martin Ralph in 1988 while studying a laboratory shipment of Syrian hamsters. They observed a hamster with an abnormal circadian period, and after breeding and further characterization, the two realized the mutation in hamsters conferred a shorter than normal free-running period. They attributed this phenotype to what they termed the "tau mutation", which was the first full description of a mammalian circadian mutant. This discovery provided a tool for other scientists to perform research on biological clocks and was an important early development in the field.

=== Human CK1ε Cloned ===
In 1995, the human form of CK1ε was first isolated and cloned by the Virshup lab at the University of Utah. It was officially identified as an isoform of the casein kinase 1 family. Three transcript variants encoding the same protein have been found for this gene in rats: CK1ε1, CK1ε2, and CK1ε3; and two have been found in humans.

=== Gene Mapping ===
In 2000, the CK1ε gene was later mapped and identified by Joseph Takahashi and colleagues, who, using genetically directed representational difference analysis, discovered that the tau mutation was located on the CK1ε gene. The CK1ε gene was found to be similar to the doubletime gene in Drosophila, which had been first characterized and incorporated into biological clock function by Michael Young and colleagues in 1998. In humans, the CSNK1E gene localizes at 22q13.1 and consists of 12 exons.

=== Structural Imaging ===
Structural imaging was performed of CK1ε in 2012 by Alexander Long and colleagues using X-ray crystallography. Certain kinase-related structural motifs were subsequently confirmed, such as a β-strand-turn-β-strand motif that anchors ATP, a DFG motif that orients ATP's phosphates, a catalytic loop that resembles that of PKA, and major substrate recognition sites in the C-terminal domain.

== Structure ==
The three-dimensional structures of the catalytic domains of the mammalian CK1δ and CK1ε were first solved by X-ray crystallography in 1996 and 2012 respectively. CK1 kinase has multiple isoforms, including a total of seven characterized isoforms in mammals (alpha, beta, gamma1-3, delta, and epsilon. The different isoforms differ mostly in the length and structure of their C-terminal non-catalytic region. Only the delta and epsilon isoforms have been shown to play an important role in circadian rhythm regulation.

CK1δ and CK1ε share a highly similar pattern in their structures. The glycine rich P-loop is between the β1 and β2 strands, forming a classical β-strand-turn-β-strand motif that anchors and clamps the alpha phosphate of ATP. CK1δ/ε additionally share conserved features within the catalytic domain, which are composed of both a N-terminal lobe and an α-helical C-terminal lobe. The catalytic center is located in the cleft region between the two lobes, which also associates with the nucleotide and the substrate. All known inhibitors bind to this center, blocking ATP binding.

== Function ==
=== Enzyme function ===
The protein encoded by the casein kinase 1 epsilon gene is a serine/threonine protein kinase and a member of the casein kinase I protein family, whose members have been implicated in the control of cytoplasmic and nuclear processes, including DNA replication and repair. Like other casein kinase 1 protein family members, casein kinase 1 epsilon recognizes the Ser(p)XXSer/Thr motif for phosphorylation. It is found in the cytoplasm as a monomer and can phosphorylate a variety of proteins, including itself. This autophosphorylation occurs in the protein's C-Terminal domain, a region believed to behave as a pseudosubstrate, and inhibits kinase activity.

=== The Circadian Clock ===
The Casein kinase 1 epsilon protein is part of the mammalian oscillator, a group of proteins that keep cells on a roughly 24-hour schedule. This oscillator, or "circadian clock," is made up of a transcription-translation feedback loop (TTFL) in which several proteins work in tandem, each regulating the others' expression to generate a roughly 24-hour cycle of both mRNA and protein levels. The TTFL also generates roughly 24-hour rhythms of outputs such as levels of cellular hormone release. Daily oscillations in protein and mRNA transcription have been observed in many cells, including the mammalian master clock known as the suprachiasmatic nucleus (SCN). However, unlike most circadian rhythm proteins that oscillate in their expression, casein kinase 1 epsilon is constitutively active.

The core proteins that comprise the mammalian TTFL include Period (PER), Cryptochrome (CRY), BMAL1, CLOCK, and casein kinase 1 epsilon. BMAL1 and CLOCK work to increase PER and CRY transcription by forming a heterodimer and binding on the E-box domain upstream from the PER and CRY gene coding sequences. PER and CRY levels are regulated by negative feedback, meaning that they repress their own transcription. Phosphorylation of PER proteins by CK1ε in both the cytoplasm and the nucleus marks these proteins for degradation. Phosphorylation also hinders PER's ability to enter the nucleus by inducing a conformational change in its nuclear localization sequence. On the other hand, the protein complex FBXL3 mediates the degradation of CRY proteins in the cytoplasm and nucleus. If CRY binds to PER before it is phosphorylated by CK1ε, these three proteins stabilize into a complex that can enter the nucleus. Once inside the nucleus, PER and CRY work to inhibit their own transcription while casein kinase 1 epsilon works to modulate the activity of BMAL1 and CLOCK through phosphorylation.

As previously stated, the C-Terminal domain of casein kinase 1 epsilon behaves as a pseudosubstrate when phosphorylated, inhibiting kinase activity. The C-Terminal domain has also been shown to be dephosphorylated by phosphatases such as Protein phosphatase 1 (PP1) in vitro and cell culture, which regulates levels of active casein kinase in vivo. Current theory of circadian rhythms hypothesizes that this phosphorylation/dephosphorylation cycle of casein kinase 1 epsilon is important in modulation of the period of circadian rhythms in the cell, with increased phosphorylation decreasing casein kinase 1 epsilon activity (and subsequently increasing active CRY and PER) and dephosphorylation of casein kinase 1 epsilon resulting in a more active kinase (and lower levels of active CRY and PER).

In mice, casein kinase 1 epsilon has been shown to phosphorylate both PER1 and PER2, as well as CRY1 and CRY2. Casein kinase 1 results in a cyclic expression of mammalian oscillator proteins, resulting in a timekeeper (mammalian oscillator) for the cell:

Mammalian PER and CRY Protein Levels
	Protein Level	Immediate Result	Delayed Result
Dawn (7 am)	low PER and CRY protein concentration	Per and Cry (gene) actively transcribed and stimulated by transcription factors BMAL1 and CLOCK	N/A
Dusk (7 pm)	high PER and CRY protein concentration	high PER and CRY protein levels repress Per and Cry (gene) transcription	casein kinase 1 epsilon phosphorylates PER and CRY, marking the protein for degradation: PER and CRY protein concentration decreases

==== Mutations to circadian function ====
The prominent phenotype in the CK1ε tau mutant hamsters discovered by Menaker was an unusually short free-running period — 22 hours in heterozygotes, and 20 hours in homozygotes for the mutation—making this allele semidominant. The CK1ε gene was later mapped and identified by Joseph Takahashi and colleagues, which revealed a single base-pair C-to-T substitutional mutation in the hamster CK1ε gene. This single nucleotide polymorphism (SNP) results in an arginine-to-cysteine substitution in a phosphate recognition domain region of CK1ε, a highly conserved region of the gene across mammals. Presently, it is unclear how exactly the CK1ε-tau mutation results in a shorter free-running period. However, it has been suggested that the tau mutation is a gain-of-function mutation, leading to increased phosphorylation of certain PER sites, thereby increasing the rate of PER degradation and shortening the circadian period. The CK1ε-tau mutation in hamsters was the first full description of a mammalian circadian mutant.

In humans, mutations affecting the PER2 phosphorylation site of the CK1ε and/or CK1δ gene result in Familial Advanced Sleep Phase Syndrome (FASPS). This mutation, S662G, which results in the loss of a single phosphate acceptor site on PER2, prevents CK1ε protein from binding to PER and leads to an unusually short circadian period.

Additionally, a heritable mutation in human CK1δ, T44A, has been identified as another mutation that causes period shortening, and it has been identified as another mechanism that causes FASPS. This mutation reduces CK1δ activity in vivo in humans, and has similarly been shown to do the same in mice. However, experiments in other species such as flies have shown that this mutation induces period lengthening effects.

Furthermore, in humans, the P415A and H417R mutations in PER3 have been shown to destabilize the protein. These mutations have been shown to generate FASPS and are also associated with impaired mood regulation.

==== Temperature compensation ====
CK1δ/ε is temperature-compensated, a feature of many circadian rhythms. The ability of CK1δ/ε to phosphorylate its substrates remains constant even when temperature fluctuates, whereas normal reactions rates tend to increase with increasing temperature. Moreover, CK1ε tau mutants show a loss of temperature compensation.

==== Non-mammalian homologs ====
Two circadian rhythm functional homologs of this mammalian protein can be found in Drosophila melanogaster (fruit fly). Functional homologs refer to proteins sharing a similar function in another animal but that are not necessarily genetically similar.

One gene, coding for the protein Doubletime (abbreviated dbt), serves a similar purpose to casein kinase 1 epsilon in chronobiology, as it plays a role in the phosphorylation of PER. However its gene sequence shows no sequence homology. In addition, casein kinase 1 epsilon does not completely rescue circadian rhythms in fruit fly doubletime knockouts (dbt -/-), suggesting that these enzymes serve similar, but not identical, functions.

Another functional homolog, the Drosophila gene for glycogen synthase kinase 3 (GSK3), called shaggy and abbreviated sgg, codes for a protein which phosphorylates Timeless (TIM), the fruit fly CRY functional homolog. Like dbt, shaggy is not a sequence homolog to casein kinase 1 epsilon. Conversely, Gsk3 is also found in mammals, and mutants have been implicated in circadian rhythm abnormalities in patients suffering with bipolar disorder.

The Drosophila melanogaster genome contains other casein kinase 1 family enzymes, which are believed to serve no circadian function. However, a different casein kinase family enzyme, casein kinase 2 alpha, has been implicated in providing the initial phosphorylation of a serine residue that is recognized by both DBT and Shaggy for sequential PER and TIM phosphorylation.

==== Importance of CK1δ ====
While CK1ε has traditionally been considered the main regulator of PER and CRY phosphorylation, Casein kinase 1 isoform delta (CK1δ or CSNK1D), an isoform, is thought to play a similar role in the TTFL. Both CK1ε and CK1δ phosphorylate and destabilize PER in vitro as well as interact with PER and CRY in vivo. Moreover, CK1δ has been shown to better interact with proteins of the drosophila molecular clock than CK1ε, indicating that CK1δ may be more homologous to dbt than CK1ε. Additionally, mass spectrometry has shown CK1δ to be over 20 times as abundant as CK1ε in the liver.

==== Phosphoswitch Mechanism ====
Phosphorylation of PER2 is believed to be regulated by a phosphoswitch mechanism. Specifically, PER2 requires an initial priming phosphorylation in order to be phosphorylated and subsequently degraded by CK1δ and/or CK1ε. In this manner, temporally sequenced phosphorylations of PER2 act to delay its degradation rate and may provide insight into how the circadian clock is temperature compensated. CK1δ and/or CK1ε may provide the priming activity. The FASP site on PER2 is a key target of this priming kinase activity. Mutations to this site can affect the ability of PER2 to receive a priming phosphorylation, leading to a lengthening or shortening of period. Other studies have suggested that down stream phosphorylation of PER2 leads to stabilizing interactions that decrease the degradation rate of PER. This is thought to increase the period of the circadian clock. Mutations in the phosphorylation area of PER2 are thought to be related to FASPS patients

=== Other functions ===
==== Canonical Wnt pathway ====
The canonical Wnt Pathway involves the accumulation of β-catenin in the cytoplasm, which activates transcription factors. Casein kinase 1 epsilon, and related casein kinase 1 delta, is dephosphorylated in this pathway. Dephosphorylation of casein kinase 1 epsilon is likely achieved by Protein Phosphatase 2 (PP2A), which increases both the enzymes' kinase activity in vivo. Casein kinase 1 epsilon and casein kinase 1 delta have been implicated in increasing β-catenin's stability in the cytoplasm, although studies of the mechanism for this stabilization are inconclusive. The current theory for how casein kinase 1 epsilon and/or casein kinase 1 delta function in this pathway is that both casein kinases either directly stabilize β-catenin though positive regulation, or that they indirectly stabilizes β-catenin through negative regulation of the β-catenin degradation complex (protease).

===== Cancer =====
Casein kinase 1 epsilon and delta are known to phosphorylate a tumor suppressor protein, p53 in vivo in both humans and murine, or old world rats. CK1 phosphorylates p53 on its N-terminus to induce its activation, which subsequently increases cell cycle arrest and apoptosis. Damage to DNA has been shown to activate p53 through enhanced CK1 activation. Inactivation of CK1 leads to decreased resistance to apoptosis.

Casein kinase 1 epsilon is also implicated as indirectly causing cancer through its regulation of Yes-associated protein (YAP), an oncogene and regulator of organ size. After priming through phosphorylation by the serine/threonine kinase LATS, both casein kinase 1 epsilon and casein kinase 1 delta have been shown to phosphorylate YAP and mark it for ubiquitination and degradation.

==== Addiction ====
Several studies have demonstrated a connection between molecular components of the circadian clock and psychiatric disorders, particularly drug abuse. Genetic association studies in humans have implicated CK1ε/CK1δ in the development of addictions to methamphetamine, heroin, and alcohol. Moreover, mouse studies reveal a link between CK1ε/CK1δ activity and the stimulant effect produced by methamphetamine. Additionally, inhibition of CK1ε/CK1δ in rodents has been shown to decrease alcohol and opiate relapse behavior during withdrawal.

== Interactions ==
Casein kinase 1 epsilon has been shown to interact with PER1, PER2, CRY1, CRY2, BMAL1, CLOCK, NPAS2, and AXIN1. PER1, PER2, and BMAL1 can be directly phosphorylated by CK1ɛ, while PER3, CRY1, and CRY2 can only be phosphorylated by CK1ɛ when associated with PER1 or PER2.

== Inhibitors ==
Several inhibitors have been produced by biotechnology companies to facilitate research on the function of casein kinase 1 epsilon. Testing utilizing CK1ε inhibitors have confirmed the involvement of CK1ε in a variety of processes, especially in regulation of circadian rhythms.

=== PF-670462 and PF-4800567 ===
PF-670462, developed by Pfizer, is a well-characterized inhibitor of both CK1ε and CK1δ that has been shown to lengthen the period of circadian rhythms when administered in vitro to rat fibroblasts and COS cells, and to mice in vivo. PF-4800567, also developed by Pfizer, is a specific inhibitor of CK1ε. However, its ability to lengthen circadian rhythms is weaker than that of PF-670462 in both the in vitro rat fibroblasts and in vivo mice models. The mechanisms of inhibition of PF-670462 and PF-4800567 differ between the two molecules as well. PF-670462 maintains CK1ε/δ with the DFG motif facing inward, whereas PF-4800567 hydrophobically interacts with CK1ε/δ to turn the DFG motif outwards, indicative of a Type-II Kinase.

=== IC261 ===
IC261 is an inhibitor that targets the ATP binding site of both CK1δ and CK1ε. Similarly, it has been shown to lengthen circadian period in rat fibroblasts, and has been implicated in cancer treatment therapies for pancreatic and neuroblastomic cancers.

=== Others ===
Other CK1 inhibitors, such as D4476, and pyrazolopyridine analogues, that both target CK1δ, have been characterized to have therapeutic abilities, but their beneficial effects are not well-studied and may stem from other cellular targets.

== See also ==
- Gene nomenclature
