= PF-4800567 =

Chemical compound

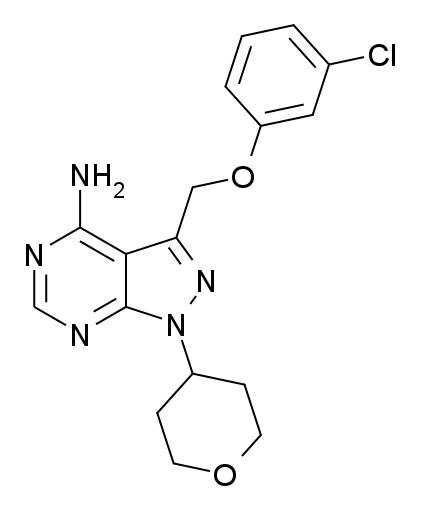

Identifiers
- IUPAC name: 3-(3-chloro-phenoxymethyl)-1-(tetrahydro-pyran-4-yl)-1H-pyrazolo[3,4-d]pyrimidin-4-ylamine
- CAS Number: 1188296-52-7
- PubChem CID: 53472153
- IUPHAR/BPS: 8050
- ChemSpider: 26325201
- UNII: GEE72DRC63
- ChEBI: CHEBI:87237
- CompTox Dashboard (EPA): DTXSID20703849

Chemical and physical data
- Formula: C_{17}H_{18}ClN_{5}O_{2}
- Molar mass: 359.81 g·mol^{−1}
- 3D model (JSmol): Interactive image
- SMILES: c4c(Cl)cccc4OCc(c1c3N)nn(c1ncn3)C2CCOCC2
- InChI: InChI=1S/C17H18ClN5O2/c18-11-2-1-3-13(8-11)25-9-14-15-16(19)20-10-21-17(15)23(22-14)12-4-6-24-7-5-12/h1-3,8,10,12H,4-7,9H2,(H2,19,20,21); Key:AUMDBEHGJRZSOO-UHFFFAOYSA-N

PF-4800567 is a drug developed by Pfizer which acts as a selective inhibitor of the enzyme Casein kinase 1 epsilon (CK1-ε), and has mainly been used in the study of the casein kinase 1 enzymes in the regulation of circadian rhythm, as well as showing potential neuroprotective effects. While this research has shown that circadian rhythm is modulated primarily by the alternate isoform CK1-δ rather than CK1-ε, both PF-4800567 and the related non-selective CK1-δ/ε inhibitor PF-670462 were found in animal studies to enhance responses to certain drugs of abuse such as methamphetamine and fentanyl, which suggests a role for CK1-ε in negative regulation of sensitivity to stimulant and opioid drugs.
