= CIART =

Transcriptional repressor protein

Identifiers
- Aliases: CIART, C1orf51, CHRONO, GM129, circadian associated repressor of transcription
- External IDs: OMIM: 615782; MGI: 2684975; GeneCards: CIART

Gene location (Human)
| Chr. | Chromosome 1 (human) |
| Band | 1q21.2 | Start | 150,282,543 bp |
| Band | 1q21.2 | End | 150,287,093 bp |

Gene location (Mouse)
| Chr. | Chromosome 3 (mouse) |
| Band | 3|3 F2.1 | Start | 95,785,815 bp |
| Band | 3|3 F2.1 | End | 95,789,563 bp |
RNA expression pattern
| Bgee | Human / Mouse (ortholog); Top expressed in: oocyte; gastric mucosa; skin of abdomen; secondary oocyte; skin of leg; muscle of thigh; caudate nucleus; gastrocnemius muscle; right hemisphere of cerebellum; gonad / Top expressed in: neural layer of retina; tail of embryo; spermatid; superior frontal gyrus; spermatocyte; visual cortex; primary visual cortex; embryo; embryo; otolith organ; More reference expression data |
| BioGPS | n/a |
Gene ontology
| Molecular function | E-box binding; core promoter sequence-specific DNA binding; protein binding; transcription cis-regulatory region binding; RNA polymerase II cis-regulatory region sequence-specific DNA binding |
| Cellular component | PML body; nucleus |
| Biological process | negative regulation of transcription, DNA-templated; regulation of transcription, DNA-templated; circadian regulation of gene expression; transcription, DNA-templated; rhythmic process; locomotor rhythm |
Sources:Amigo / QuickGO
Orthologs
| Databases | NCBI: entry; OMA: entry |
| Species | Human | Mouse |
| Entrez | 148523 | 229599 |
| Ensembl | ENSG00000159208 | ENSMUSG00000038550 |
| UniProt | Q8N365 | Q3TQ03 |
| RefSeq (mRNA) | NM_144697; NM_001300838; NM_001300839; NM_001300840; NM_001300841 | NM_001033302 |
| RefSeq (protein) | NP_001287767; NP_001287768; NP_001287769; NP_001287770; NP_653298 | NP_001028474 |
| Location (UCSC) | Chr 1: 150.28 – 150.29 Mb | Chr 3: 95.79 – 95.79 Mb |
| PubMed search |
- Wikidata
| View/Edit Human | View/Edit Mouse |

Circadian Associated Repressor of Transcription (also known as Chrono or Gm129) is a protein that in humans is encoded by the CIART gene.

The CIART protein functions as a transcriptional repressor of the BMAL1-CLOCK complex. In addition to negatively regulating the circadian transcription-translation feedback loop (TTFL), the CIART protein is involved with stress metabolism response in response to cortisol. New research implicates that CIART protein and glucocorticoid receptors form a complex and regulate response to stress in a circadian manner.

== History and discovery ==
As multiple laboratories were investigating what genes Bmal1 (a core activator of the TTFL cycle) regulate on the E-box, three independent laboratories converged on a single gene of interest. In February 2014, Dr. Sancar Aziz and colleagues published an article identifying a new clock gene component of the TTFL, in Journal of Biological Chemistry (Gm129, which would later be renamed to CIART). In April 2014, Dr. Takumi's team and Dr. Hogenesch's team coordinated publications documenting the function of this gene in PLOS Biology. All projects employed genome wide analysis, and techniques like Chromatin Immunoprecipitation (ChIP) and machine learning to isolate CIART from other genes that Bmal1 regulates. Both research teams proposed renaming the gene to Chrono for either "computationally-highlighted" or "ChIP-derived" repressor of network oscillator. Ultimately, CIART became the official name. In particular, CIART stood out from other gene targets because its expression was circadian, its protein localized to the nucleus, and its expression was in anti-phase with Bmal1 and Clock. Further work clarified that this gene plays an integral role in regulating the TTFL cascade that helps generate circadian rhythms.

== Gene regulation ==
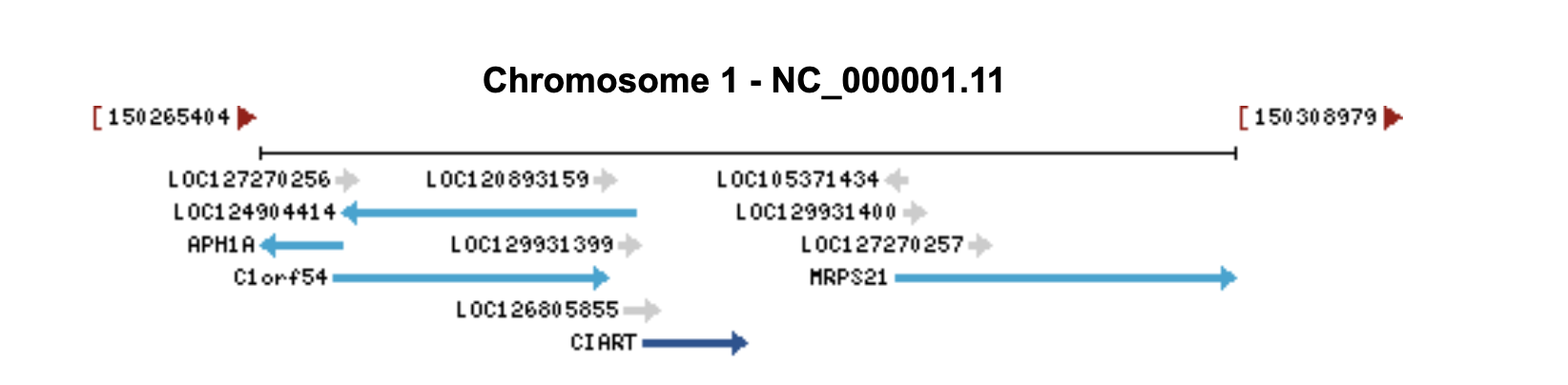

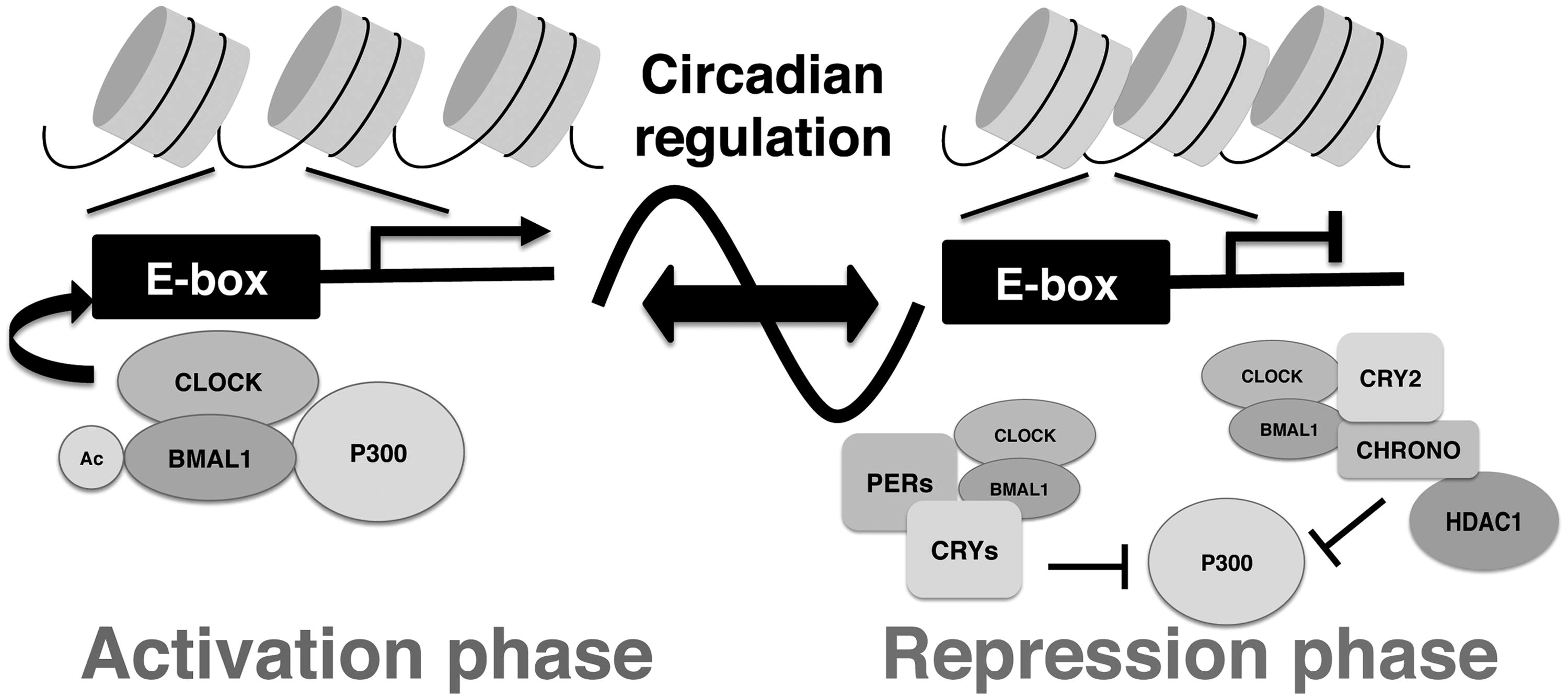

CIART gene is located on the long arm of Chromosome 1, at band 21.2 (1q21.2). The gene length is around 4500 base pairs, with a total of 6 exons. Reports indicate largest CIART expression in tissues including heart, thyroid, brain, adrenal glands, and testis. However, broad CIART gene expression is found all throughout the body, in 24 different tissues. Genetic analysis using ChIP revealed its gene expression is anti-phase with BMAL1. Specifically, after Bmal1 turns on CIART gene expression, the translated CIART protein enters the nucleus and represses Bmal1/Clock gene expression through histone deacetylation mechanisms (HDAC).

To test binding to the CIART promoter, different sizes of promoter constructs from brain samples were used, starting at the transcriptional start (TSS) site, showing that the closest E-box to the TSS was necessary to promote circadian oscillation of CIART and that all three E-boxes could contribute. Thus, BMAL1 binds strongly to CIART E-boxes on the promoter, regulating the circadian expression of the novel gene2.

== Species distribution ==
The CIART gene has been identified in humans and orthologs have been identified in mice, chimpanzees, dogs, lizards, and zebrafish. In mice, this ortholog is located on chromosome 3, about 4200 Base pairs long, and contains 9 exons, which shows a conserved regulatory system that is similar across vertebrate species. This suggests a well conserved evolutionary molecular mechanism in vertebrates.

== Structure ==
Current research indicates the CIART protein consists of 375 amino acids with no functional domains. When examined via in vitro translation, CIART and CIART-FLAG are identified at 46 kDa1 . Ongoing research is elucidating the specific 3D configuration of the protein and how it interacts with the Bmal/Clock dimer. However, some researchers, including Yu Yang and his team, report that CIART's repressive domain, which downregulates Bmal/Clock, is rich with alpha helices. Additionally, the N-terminus of the protein contains a nuclear localization sequence (NLS).

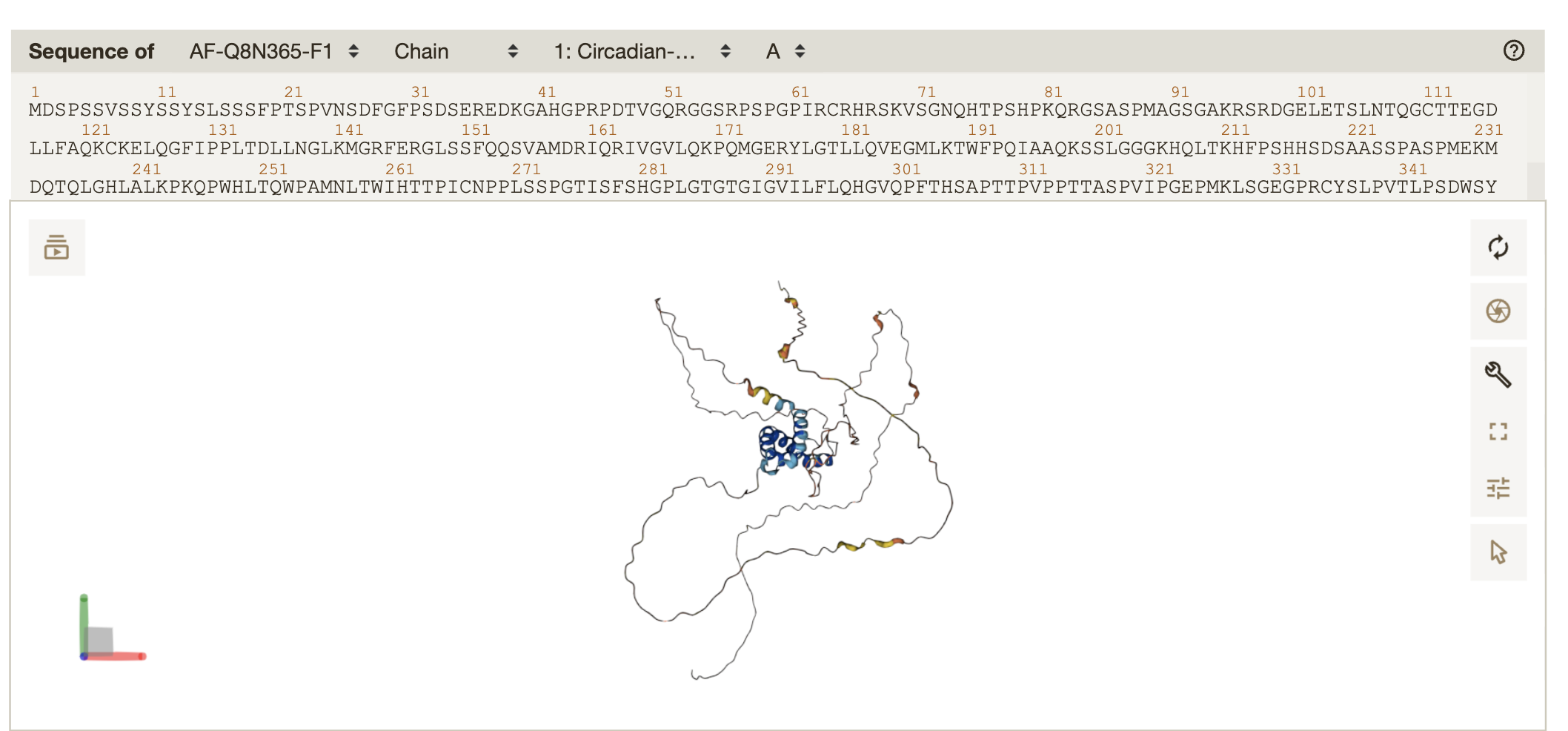

== Function ==
The CIART protein is an important negative regulator of the TTFL in the mammalian clock system. The TTFL system starts with gene expression of Bmal1 and Clock genes, and translation into Bmal1 and Clock proteins. Next, these proteins utilize their Nuclear Localization Sequence to enter the nucleus, and bind to the E-box elements of genes like Per1-3, Cry1-2, and CIART, and activate their gene expression. After Per2 and Cry1/2 proteins are made, they enter the nucleus to the TAD domain of Bmal1 protein, blocking recruitment of necessary co-activators, and inhibiting gene expression of Bmal1 and Clock genes. Parallel but independent of Per2 and Cry1/2 inhibition, CIART protein also uses its NLS (in particular Arg63 amino acid) to enter the nucleus and change downstream gene expression. Specifically, CIART binds to the TAD domain of Bmal1 protein, repressing transcriptional activation of the B/C complexes and also blocking the recruitment of necessary co-activators for gene expression.

Additionally, this gene also recruits Histone Deacetylases (HDACs), which deacetylate the gene of interest, thus increasing its coiling and decreasing levels of transcription on an epigenetic level. CIART is reliant on HDACs for correct functionality; in the absence of HDACs, CIART cannot function properly.

The CIART gene also plays a role in repressing the body's stress response, similarly to Cry1/2. Specifically, the CIART protein directly interacts with the glucocorticoid receptor (GR) to decrease its activity. Further, CIART protein represses transcription of genes that are downstream of glucocorticoid signaling. This regulation plays an integral role in helping generate daily rhythms in glucocorticoid sensitivity throughout the day, which plays a large role in metabolism, immunity, and mental health. One research team found that mice with CIART knockouts exhibited enhanced GR signaling, corroborating the finding that CIART negatively regulates stress signaling.

== Clinical significance ==
Recent research has implicated CIART in regulating SARS-CoV-2 infection and viral reproduction. Specifically, reports indicate that double-negative CIART in cells has exhibited to SARS-CoV-2 infection. This resistance appears to be mediated through the Retinoid X Receptor pathway, responsible for regulating fatty acid metabolism, downstream of CIART. This data suggests that a decrease in fatty acid synthesis due to the removal of CIART lowers the infection rate for SARS-CoV-2.

Pathophysiology in the CIART gene has been implicated with terminal osseous dysplasia, gallbladder benign neoplasm, gallbladder adenoma, and esophageal adenosquamous carcinoma. These associations show a broader role of CIART in cell regulation and growth in addition to its circadian functions.

Current literature has proposed a link between levels of CIART gene expression and bipolar disorder(BD). A chronobiological model suggests that core clock genes, including CIART, affect the vulnerability to bipolar disorder. CIART may serve as a biomarker for circadian dysregulation in BD, as in a study that compares the expression levels of 19 circadian genes in individuals with BD, there was a significant CIART expression, in addition to circadian genes such as ARNTL, ARNTL2, DBP, PER2, and TIMELESS.

== Research ==
Current research on CIART centers on its role as a key repressor within the mammalian circadian clock, where it regulates the BMAL1/CLOCK transcriptional complex through protein–protein interactions, chromatin remodeling, and subcellular trafficking. Studies have explored its rhythmic DNA binding, interaction with glucocorticoid signaling, and function in stress response and metabolic regulation. Recent work highlights CIART's involvement in epigenetic modulation and glucose metabolism, particularly under high-fat diet conditions. Future directions include further elucidating its molecular mechanisms, its tissue-specific roles in circadian regulation, and its potential as a therapeutic target in metabolic and stress-related disorders.
