= Steve A. Kay =

British-born chronobiologist

Steve Kay FRS
- Born: October 4 Jersey
- Education: University of Bristol, UK
- Known for: chronobiology, genomics
- Awards: Thomson Reuters Highly Cited Researcher, ASPB Award for the Martin Gibbs Medal, AAAS Fellow, Member of the National Academy of Sciences USA, Science Breakthroughs of the Year 2002, Science Breakthroughs of the Year 1998, Science Breakthroughs of the Year 1997

Steve A. Kay FRS is a British-born chronobiologist who mainly works in the United States. Dr. Kay has pioneered methods to monitor daily gene expression in real time and characterized circadian gene expression in plants, flies and mammals. In 2014, Steve Kay celebrated 25 years of successful chronobiology research at the Kaylab 25 Symposium, joined by over one hundred researchers with whom he had collaborated with or mentored. Dr. Kay, a member of the National Academy of Sciences, U.S.A., briefly served as president of The Scripps Research Institute. and is currently a professor at the University of Southern California. He also served on the Life Sciences jury for the Infosys Prize in 2011.

== Life ==
=== Early life and influences ===
Steve A. Kay was raised on the Isle of Jersey off the coast of Normandy. As a young child, he was fascinated by marine creatures exposed during low tide on Jersey island. His interest in biology deepened when an elementary teacher brought a microscope from mainland England into his small classroom. He spent hours looking through the microscope at swimming critters in pond water, amazed by "what was in pond water, or what the edges of a torn piece of paper looked like." By his early teens, Steve Kay knew that biology would be his lifelong passion and aimed to get a PhD. Years later, when his mother died of a progressive motor neuron disease in 2006, Steve Kay was motivated to study a mouse mutant he co-discovered that modeled the disease his mother had. Thus, a tribute to his mother has led to the discovery of the gene Listerin, Ltn1, E3 ubiquitin ligase and its effect on motor and sensory neuron degeneration.

=== Education and scientific pursuits ===
In 1981, Steve Kay earned his bachelor's degree in Biochemistry at University of Bristol, UK. He stayed there in the Trevor Griffiths lab and received his PhD in 1985 exploring the light regulation of chlorophyll synthesis in plants. Kay learned that light changed gene expression, and that circadian clock was also regulating transcription on a daily basis. He would later spend more than two decades pursuing these circadian clocks. Following Griffiths' advice, Kay moved to the United States and worked as a postdoc in the Nam-Hai Chua lab at Rockefeller University. It was at the Nam-Hai Chua lab working with another postdoc named Ferenc Nagy that Kay stumbled upon the discovery that the chlorophyll binding gene CAB was regulated by a circadian clock. In 1989, Kay was appointed to his first faculty position as an assistant professor at Rockefeller University. While there, he collaborated with Michael W. Young to identify fly PER gene homologues, which did not exist. Kay then developed glowing Arabidopsis thaliana plants to screen for circadian rhythm mutants, with the help of his student Andrew Millar, and subsequently identified TOC1, the first clock gene identified in plants.

He moved several times and became an associate professor in the biology department at the University of Virginia in 1996 where he joined the NSF Center for Biological Timing. 4 years later he moved to The Scripps Research Institute in La Jolla, Ca. There, Kay collaborated with Jeffrey C. Hall and discovered a cryptochrome mutant in fruit flies, also demonstrating that clock genes were distributed all over the body, which was named one of Science's top 10 breakthroughs in 1997. Kay also teamed up with Joe Takahashi to identify fly's CLOCK gene and its binding partner dBMAL1 and complete the transcription-translation feedback loop in flies in 1998.

In 1999, Kay established his second lab adjacent to Scripps Research Institute at the Genomics Institute of the Novartis Research Foundation to initiate new work on the mammalian clock. He and his postdoctoral fellow John B. Hogenesch, realized that in order to discover novel mammalian clock genes one would have to leverage high throughput genomics techniques that were being developed at the time. In 2002, Kay's group identified the novel photoreceptor melanopsin (Opn4) and how it worked in conjunction with the visual photoreceptors. Kay's work, along with others in the field, on melanopsin was named one of "Science's" top 10 breakthroughs that year. Kay and Hogenesch also collaborated with Takahashi to define the mammalian circadian transcription and the large scale orchestration of gene expression by the circadian clocks in most tissues throughout the body.

In 2001, Kay served as director for the Institute for Childhood and Neglected Diseases at the Scripps Research Institute. He also served as professor and chairman there in subsequent years. In addition to his academic experiences, Kay also founded biotechnology companies like Phenomix Corporation in 2003. In 2007, Dr. Kay became professor and then the dean of the biology department at the UC San Diego. From 2012 to 2015, he served as a professor and the Dean of Dornsife College of Letters, Arts and Sciences at the University of Southern California (USC).

In September 2015, he was named president of The Scripps Research Institute. In 2016, he was re-appointed to the University of Southern California (USC).

== Scientific contributions to circadian rhythms ==
=== Plants ===
In 1985, Kay and his colleagues found that the Cab gene was under circadian control in wheat and transgenic tobacco plants during his postdoctoral research. In 1991, Kay extended this research into a suitable model plant, Arabidopsis thaliana and found that Cab mRNA levels are also under circadian control in Arabidopsis. He then developed Cab2:luc fusion, the fusion of luciferase open reading frame downstream of the Cab2 promoter region, as a marker for monitoring the circadian phenotype. This fusion marker was widely used in later studies and contributed enormously to the understanding of circadian rhythm regulation in Arabidopsis.

Based on this Cab:luc fusion technology, Kay set up luciferase imaging assays for large scale forward genetics screening and identified the first short period mutant of TOC1 gene. TOC1 was proved to be a core clock gene in Arabidopsis and was cloned by Kay lab after a long period of time Kay also revealed the biochemical function of TOC1 and found that TOC1 and LHY/CCA1 reciprocally regulate each other, and further studied the mechanism of this regulation.

Kay identified ELF3, GI, Lux, CHE and PRRs as core clock genes and studied their role in the circadian regulation loop. He also profiled clock controlled genes (ccg) in Arabidopsis with several technologies and identified key pathways temporally controlled by circadian clock. His work on functional analyses of core clock genes, as well as ccg, successfully connected circadian rhythm with the control of development, like seedling, growth and flowering. His work on these clock genes contributed significantly to the understanding of repression-based clock regulation loops in plants, which is distinct to the ones in animals that are composed of both positive and negative elements.

Kay discovered the mechanism of seasonal time and day-length measurement and flowering time determination in Arabidopsis through the GI/FKF1-CO-FT pathway.

Kay found evidence that there are multiple phototransduction pathways, and contributed to the discovery and functional analysis of many photoreceptors, including phytochrome, cryptochrome, ZTL and LKP2 and their roles in circadian rhythms.

=== Flies ===
Kay applied the first clock gene fusion, Per:luc, in Drosophila melanogaster which allows monitoring of its rhythm at the single animal level. Per:luc fusion also helped him understand the phase relationship in mRNA and protein oscillation. He further improved the mathematical method of bioluminescence analysis and made the results quantified. In 1997, his Per promoter driven Green Fluorescent Protein (GFP) study suggested that Per is widely expressed throughout the fly body in a rhythmic pattern, and all body parts are capable of light perception. This is one of the first pieces of evidence for a peripheral self-sustaining circadian clock. In 1998, he proposed the translational transcriptional feedback loop model of the circadian clock in flies, analogous to other labs that proposed a same model in mammals and fungi.

Kay discovered that cryptochrome is the circadian photoreceptor that directly acts with and sequesters TIM in response to light.

Kay did one of the pioneering microarray analyses to study clock controlled genes (ccg), and revealed tissue-specific nature of circadian rhythms by analyzing the ccg of heads and bodies separately.

=== Mice ===
Kay began his extensive research on mice in 1999 at the Genomics Institute of the Novartis Research Foundation, with a primary focus on melanopsin (Opn4) and visual photoreceptors. It was here, with the use of automation and large-scale genomics technology, that Kay and collaborating colleagues found that the mammalian clock consisted of more than just one feedback loop.

In 2002, Kay and his team were able to show the role of melanopsin, a photosensitive photopigment in retinal ganglion cells, in detecting light for the master circadian oscillator located in the suprachiasmatic nucleus (SCN) in the hypothalamus of the brain. Both melanopsin and visual photoreceptors, such as rods and cones, were required for entrainment. However, removing each individually did not result in total blindness in mice, as they retained non-visual photoreception.

The enzyme luciferase was utilized by Kay's lab to research clock gene expression in single culture cells and revealed that a variety of cells, including those of the liver and fibroblasts, demonstrate circadian rhythm. As time went on, these rhythms became increasingly out of phase as local oscillators desynchronized and each cell expressed their own pace. In 2007, these findings demonstrated the need to examine single-cell phenotypes along with behaviors of experimental clock mutants.

In 2009, inspired by his mother's fatal motor neuron disease, Kay and some colleagues performed a study manipulating the ubiquitin ligase protein Listerin in mice which led to the conclusion that mutations in Listerin caused neurodegeneration.

=== Humans ===
Kay's research on intercellular networks has the potential to contribute to drug therapies by identifying compounds that affect the circadian pathways. His findings and analyses of this mammalian oscillator contribute to our medical understanding of how the clock controls downstream processes and holds clinical significance as a variety of diseases and biological processes are involved, such as aging, immune response, and metabolism.

For instance, diabetes and the circadian clock may correlate based on the findings of circadian expression in the liver and glucose output. Using a cell-cased circadian phenotypic screen, Kay and a team of chronobiologist researchers identified a small molecule, KL001, that interacts with cryptochrome to prevent ubiquitin-dependent degradation, which results in a longer circadian period. KL001-mediated cryptochrome stabilization (of both CRY1 and CRY2) was found to restrain glucagon-activated gluconeogenesis. These findings bear the potential to aid in the development of circadian-based diabetic therapeutics.

Circadian clocks have also been shown to influence cancer treatments, where circadian disruption accelerates processes and drug responses are affected by the time of administration with respect to the circadian cycle.

== Positions and honors ==
- Thomson Reuters Highly Cited Researcher
- ASPB Award for the Martin Gibbs Medal
- AAAS Fellow
- Member of the National Academy of Sciences USA
- Science Breakthroughs of the Year 2002
- Science Breakthroughs of the Year 1998
- Science Breakthroughs of the Year 1997

== Notable publications ==
- See Steve Kay's Google Scholar Profile
