= BMAL2 =

Protein-coding gene in humans

Identifiers
- Aliases: BMAL2, CLIF, MOP9, PASD9, bHLHe6, aryl hydrocarbon receptor nuclear translocator like 2, ARNTL2, Basic helix-loop-helix ARNT like 2
- External IDs: OMIM: 614517; MGI: 2684845; GeneCards: BMAL2
Available structures
PDB	Ortholog search: PDBe RCSB
PDB	List of PDB id codes 2KDK

Gene location (Human)
Chr.	Chromosome 12 (human)
Band	12p11.23	Start	27,332,836 bp
Band	12p11.23	End	27,425,289 bp

Gene location (Mouse)
Chr.	Chromosome 6 (mouse)
Band	6|6 G3	Start	146,697,553 bp
Band	6|6 G3	End	146,735,027 bp
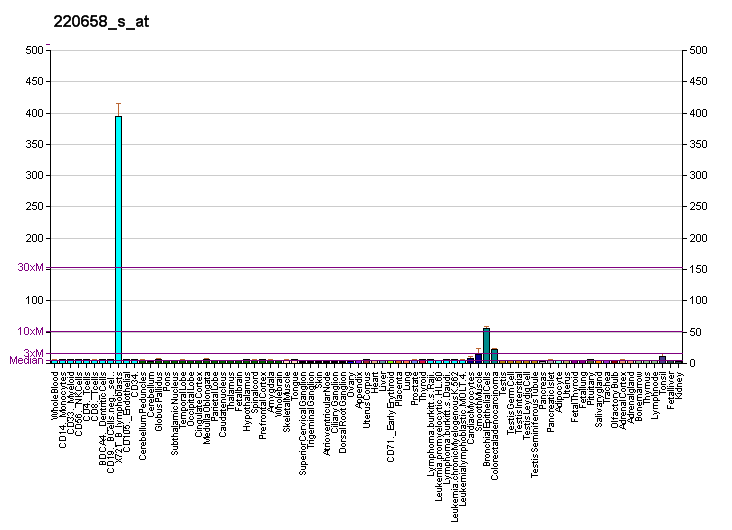
RNA expression pattern
Bgee	Human / Mouse (ortholog); Top expressed in: amniotic fluid; oral cavity; buccal mucosa cell; islet of Langerhans; mucosa of pharynx; gonad; testicle; gums; vagina; stromal cell of endometrium / Top expressed in: zygote; secondary oocyte; primary oocyte; esophagus; female urethra; primary visual cortex; superior frontal gyrus; lip; cumulus cell; lens; More reference expression data
BioGPS	More reference expression data
Gene ontology
Molecular function	DNA-binding transcription factor activity; DNA binding; transcription factor activity, RNA polymerase II core promoter proximal region sequence-specific binding; E-box binding; protein dimerization activity; DNA-binding transcription factor activity, RNA polymerase II-specific; RNA polymerase II cis-regulatory region sequence-specific DNA binding
Cellular component	cytoplasm; nucleolus; nucleus; transcription regulator complex
Biological process	regulation of transcription by RNA polymerase II; positive regulation of transcription, DNA-templated; positive regulation of circadian rhythm; regulation of transcription, DNA-templated; circadian rhythm; transcription, DNA-templated; positive regulation of transcription by RNA polymerase II; rhythmic process; entrainment of circadian clock
Sources:Amigo / QuickGO
Orthologs
Databases	NCBI: entry; OMA: entry
Species	Human	Mouse
Entrez	56938	272322
Ensembl	ENSG00000029153	ENSMUSG00000040187
UniProt	Q8WYA1	Q2VPD4
RefSeq (mRNA)	NM_001248002; NM_001248003; NM_001248004; NM_001248005; NM_020183 NM_001394524; NM_001394525; NM_001394526; NM_001394527; NM_001394528; NM_001394529	NM_172309; NM_001289679; NM_001289680; NM_001289681
RefSeq (protein)	NP_001234931; NP_001234932; NP_001234933; NP_001234934; NP_064568	NP_001276608; NP_001276609; NP_001276610; NP_758513
Location (UCSC)	Chr 12: 27.33 – 27.43 Mb	Chr 6: 146.7 – 146.74 Mb
PubMed search
- Wikidata
View/Edit Human	View/Edit Mouse

Basic helix-loop-helix ARNT-like protein 2, also known as ARNTL2, or MOP9, or CLIF, is a protein that in humans is encoded by the gene BMAL2 (previously ARNTL2). Note: the corresponding genes and proteins in non-human animals are often denoted using title case: such as Bmal2 or Arntl2.

Arntl2 is a paralog to Arntl, which are both homologs of the Drosophila Cycle. Homologs were also isolated in fish, birds and mammals such as mice and humans. Based on phylogenetic analyses, it was proposed that Arntl2 arose from duplication of the Arntl gene early in the vertebrate lineage, followed by rapid divergence of the Arntl gene copy. The protein product of the gene interacts with both CLOCK and NPAS2 to bind to E-box sequences in regulated promoters and activate their transcription. Although Arntl2 is not required for normal function of the mammalian circadian oscillator, it may play an important role in mediating the output of the circadian clock. Perhaps because of this, there is relatively little published literature on the role of Arntl2 in regulation of physiology.

Arntl2 is a candidate gene for human type 1 diabetes.

In overexpression studies, ARNTL2 protein forms a heterodimer with CLOCK to regulate E-box sequences in the Pai-1 promoter. Recent work suggest that this interaction may be in concert with ARNTL/CLOCK heterodimeric complexes.

== History ==
The ARNTL2 gene was originally discovered in 2000 by John B. Hogenesch et al. under the name MOP9 as a part of the PAS domain superfamily of eukaryotic transcription factors and as a homolog to ARNTL/MOP3. Hogenesch’s initial characterization of MOP9 indicated the role of the MOP9 protein as a partner of the bHLH-PAS transcription factor CLOCK in that the MOP9 protein forms a transcriptionally-active heterodimer with the circadian CLOCK protein. The MOP9 protein, like the MOP3 protein, was also found to form heterodimers with MOP4 and hypoxia-inducible factors including HIF1α. The MOP9 gene was found to be coexpressed with CLOCK in the suprachiasmatic nucleus (SCN) in the hypothalamus, the site of the central mammalian circadian oscillator. Due to MOP9 exhibiting extensive sequence identity with genes such as MOP3 and CYCLE, its dimerization with CLOCK, and the brain-specific expression of MOP9, particularly its expression in the SCN, Hogenesch et al. proposed that MOP9 is involved in the regulation of locomotor activity as a part of the mammalian circadian system. Further studies on the MOP9 gene have adopted the names ARNTL2 and BMAL2 in the same style as the previously-discovered ARNTL gene. Like ARNTL/BMAL1, one of the earliest discovered functions of BMAL2 in the circadian system was through its formation of the BMAL2-CLOCK heterodimer, and the relative transactivation of BMAL2-CLOCK and BMAL1-CLOCK have also indicated that BMAL1 and BMAL2 have distinguishable and individually important roles in the circadian system. Knockout studies of BMAL1 and BMAL2 have also demonstrated the regulatory effect of BMAL1 on BMAL2 expression, and have indicated that BMAL2 may play a more significant role in the circadian system than previously appreciated, although the exact nature of the role of BMAL2 has not yet been fully elucidated.

== Structure ==
The BMAL2 protein follows the basic helix-loop-helix structure of the PER-ARNT-SIM family and contains a bHLH-PAS domain in its N-terminal region and a variable C-terminus. The PAS domain acts as a dimerization and binding surface in the aryl hydrocarbon receptor (AHR). Overall, BMAL2 shares much of its structure with BMAL1. However, the location on Chromosome 12 of BMAL2 in humans suggests that the gene may have a different function in the embryo.

== Function ==
BMAL2 forms a heterodimer with CLOCK, and activates transcription, and plays a role in the molecular oscillator. BMAL1 and BMAL2 are positive regulators and activate transcription by binding to proximal (–565 to –560 bp) and distal (–680 to –675 bp) E-box enhancers of the PAI-1 promoter. BMAL 2 functions similarly to BMAL1, but a research study from 2009 found differences in affinities of the homolog genes. The Per2 gene showed a stronger affinity to the BMAL2-CLOCK complex, and CRY2 had a stronger affinity to BMAL1-CLOCK complex. Per2 and CRY2 both inhibit the complexes, and negatively regulate transcription. The true function on Bmal2 is not yet fully understood., A 2010 study by Shi el. al shows that overexpression of BMAL2 in a BMAL1 knockout mice rescues locomotor rhythms and metabolic rhythms. In the same study, rhythmicity was not rescued in peripheral tissues, such as the liver and lung. Bmal2 cannot replace Bmal1, and the two are not interchangeable. The protein does play an active role in the oscillator, but Bmal2 is not required for circadian oscillations in mice.

== Interactions ==
Protein	Mechanism	Source
PER1/2/3	Transcription of PER1/2/3 is activated by BMAL2-CLOCK heterodimer, and inhibits the activity of said photodimer.	
CRY1/2	Transcription of CRY1/2 is activated by BMAL2-CLOCK heterodimer, and inhibits the activity of said photodimer.	
DEC1	Transcription of DEC1 is activated by BMAL2-CLOCK heterodimer, suppresses transcription of DEC2, PER2, and DBP.	
PAI1	Transcription of PAI1 is activated by BMAL2-CLOCK heterodimer.	
SIRT1	Transcription of SIRT1 is activated by BMAL2-CLOCK heterodimer, inhibits CLOCK/NPAS1-BMAL2 activity and promotes the deacetylation and degradation of PER2.	

== Species distribution ==
Orthologs for BMAL2 have been found in many mammals other than humans, including chimpanzees, dogs and cows (ARNTL2), mice (Arntl2 and Bmal2), and rats (ARNTL2), as well as in zebrafish. ARNTL2 genes differ significantly more between species than ARNTL genes– BMAL2 proteins have diverged 20 times as quickly as BMAL1 proteins since the genes diverged, suggesting an unidentified function in BMAL1 that does not exist in BMAL2. Human and zebrafish BMAL2 proteins contained only 66% of the same amino acids, rather than 85% between human and zebrafish BMAL1 proteins. Identifying the cause of the comparatively significant differences across species in BMAL2 will be significant for understanding the function of BMAL2 in the circadian clock.

== Knockout Studies ==
Like many genes involved in the circadian system, BMAL2 is a paralog of BMAL1. However, a 2000 study by Bunger et al. demonstrated that unlike other paralog pairs in the circadian system, such as Per1/Per2, Cry1/Cry2, and Clock/Npas2, only a single knockout of either BMAL1 or BMAL2 is required to confer arrhythmicity, rather than a knockout of both paralogs, although other studies have indicated that BMAL1-specific knockouts also have significant effects on metabolism and longevity. The same 2000 study by Bunger et al. also indicated that knockouts of BMAL1 down-regulate expression of BMAL2. A 2010 study by Shi et al. found that BMAL2 expression, conferred by a constitutively expressed promoter, can rescue both circadian rhythmicity in locomotion as well as metabolic phenotypes in Bmal1-knockout mice. Thus, BMAL1 and BMAL2 form a functionally redundant paralog pair, but in mice, BMAL2 expression is regulated by BMAL1 such that knocking out BMAL1 effectively results in the knockout of both BMAL1 and BMAL2, indicating that BMAL2 may play a more important role in the circadian system than previously thought. However, this same study by Shi et al. also found that over-expression of BMAL2 is ultimately insufficient to drive circadian rhythms in the peripheral tissues of mice, thereby suggesting that the behavioral rhythms observed in this study may come from weak molecular clocks fortified through networks with the suprachiasmatic nucleus (SCN).

The C-terminal region of the BMAL1 protein is crucial for generating sustained circadian oscillations at the cellular level. Two specific domains within this intrinsically unstructured C-terminus enable this function, distinguishing BMAL1 from BMAL2. The regulation of the BMAL1 transactivation domain (TAD) as a key mechanism in circadian timing is an ongoing area of research.

== Clinical significance ==
BMAL1 and BMAL2 genes are known to have a role in glucose homeostasis. A research study from 2015 used forward genetics to find a genotype of BMAL2 associated with Type 2 diabetes. The BMAL2 rs7958822 is a polymorphism, and has various genotypes: A/G, A/A, and G/G. The study found an association that obese men with BMAL2 rs7958822 A/G and A/C genotypes had a higher prevalence of type 2 diabetes.

Prior research studies have found desynchronization in cortisol synthesis and body temperature in patients with Parkinson’s Disease, suggesting a role of the circadian genes in the disease, The study used RT-PCR assay to track the BMAL2 gene in PD patients, and found changes in expression, specifically at 21:00 and 00:00. More research is needed to find the molecular mechanism behind this, but the results suggest that BMAL 2 and the molecular clock play a role in Parkinson’s disease.

In colorectal cancer cells, the upregulation of BMAL2 has been associated with higher levels of tumor mutational burden (TMB) as a result of subsequent upregulation of PAI1. The relationship between BMAL2 and TMB has been investigated in many models, providing further evidence for a positive correlation between BMAL2 expression and the expression of promoters of TMB. However, there is still a gap in research investigating the predictive capacity of circadian gene expression, including BMAL2, relating to TMB levels.

== See also ==
- Arntl (Bmal1)
