= SUMO3 =

Protein-coding gene in the species Homo sapiens

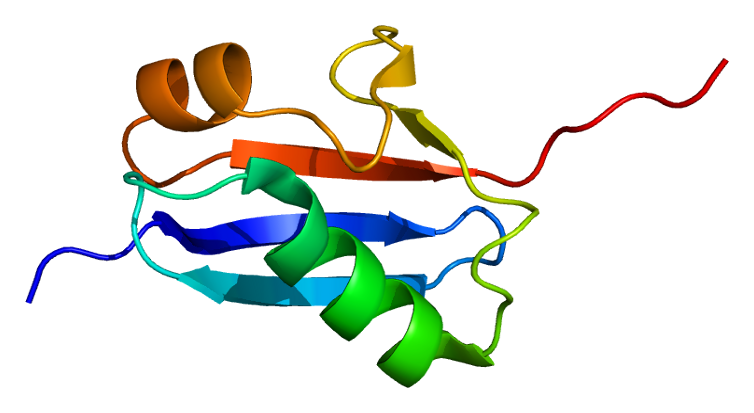

Identifiers
- Aliases: SUMO3, SMT3A, SMT3H1, SUMO-3, Smt3B, small ubiquitin-like modifier 3, small ubiquitin like modifier 3
- External IDs: OMIM: 602231; MGI: 1336201; GeneCards: SUMO3
Available structures
PDB	Ortholog search: PDBe RCSB
PDB	List of PDB id codes 1U4A, 2IO1, 2MP2

Gene location (Human)
Chr.	Chromosome 21 (human)
Band	21q22.3	Start	44,805,617 bp
Band	21q22.3	End	44,818,779 bp

Gene location (Mouse)
Chr.	Chromosome 10 (mouse)
Band	10 C1|10 39.72 cM	Start	77,441,931 bp
Band	10 C1|10 39.72 cM	End	77,454,165 bp
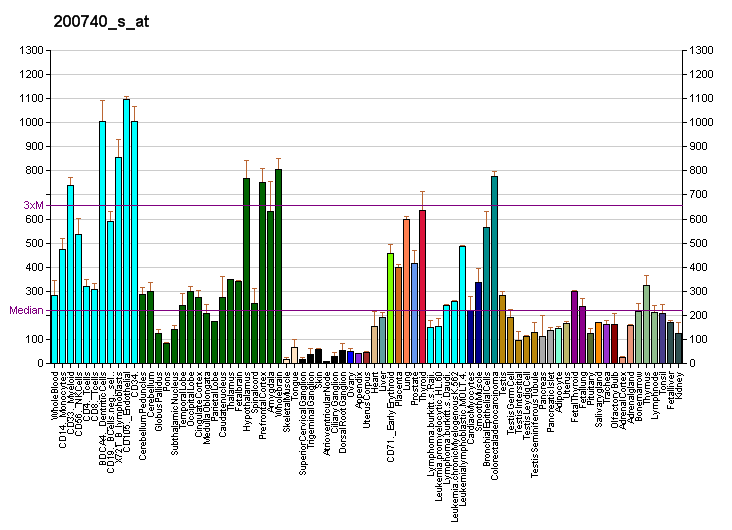

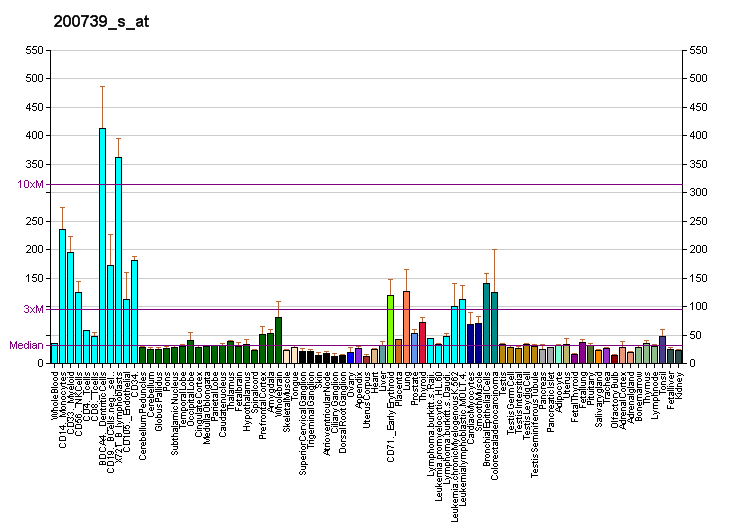
RNA expression pattern
Bgee	Human / Mouse (ortholog); Top expressed in: endothelial cell; tibia; parietal pleura; visceral pleura; palpebral conjunctiva; germinal epithelium; middle temporal gyrus; retinal pigment epithelium; Brodmann area 23; hair follicle / Top expressed in: yolk sac; neural layer of retina; olfactory bulb; striatum of neuraxis; mesencephalon; epiblast; dentate gyrus of hippocampal formation granule cell; rhombencephalon; stomach; cerebellum; More reference expression data
BioGPS	More reference expression data
Gene ontology
Molecular function	protein binding; protein tag; enzyme binding; ubiquitin-like protein ligase binding
Cellular component	cytoplasm; PML body; nucleus; kinetochore; nucleoplasm
Biological process	negative regulation of DNA binding; protein sumoylation
Sources:Amigo / QuickGO
Orthologs
Databases	NCBI: entry; OMA: entry
Species	Human	Mouse
Entrez	6612	20610
Ensembl	ENSG00000184900	ENSMUSG00000020265
UniProt	P55854	Q9Z172
RefSeq (mRNA)	NM_006936; NM_001286416	NM_001301671; NM_001301672; NM_001301673; NM_019929
RefSeq (protein)	NP_001273345; NP_008867	NP_001288600; NP_001288601; NP_001288602; NP_064313
Location (UCSC)	Chr 21: 44.81 – 44.82 Mb	Chr 10: 77.44 – 77.45 Mb
PubMed search
- Wikidata
View/Edit Human	View/Edit Mouse

Small ubiquitin-related modifier 3 is a protein that in humans is encoded by the SUMO3 gene.

== Function ==
SUMO proteins, such as SUMO3, and ubiquitin (see MIM 191339) posttranslationally modify numerous cellular proteins and affect their metabolism and function. However, unlike ubiquitination, which targets proteins for degradation, sumoylation participates in a number of cellular processes, such as nuclear transport, transcriptional regulation, apoptosis, and protein stability (Su and Li, 2002).[supplied by OMIM]

== Interactions ==
SUMO3 has been shown to interact with ARNTL and Thymine-DNA glycosylase.
