= Colleen McClung =

Colleen Ann McClung is an American chronobiologist and neuroscientist. She is a tenured professor at the University of Pittsburgh, the director of the NIDA-funded Center for Adolescent Reward, Rhythms and Sleep (CARRS), and a fellow of the American College of Neuropsychopharmacology.

== Education and career ==
In 1990, McClung began her undergraduate studies at the University of North Carolina at Chapel Hill, graduating in 1994 with Bachelor of Science in Biology and minor in Chemistry. In 1995, McClung became a student at the graduate department of the University of Virginia, and in 2001 she received a PhD in biology from the same institution under the mentorship of Jay Hirsh. In 2001, McClung started her postdoctoral work in the University of Texas Southwestern Medical Center Department of Psychiatry working with Eric J. Nestler until 2005. From 2005 until 2011, she served as an assistant professor in the same department. In 2011, McClung became an associate professor in the Department of Psychiatry at the University of Pittsburgh School of Medicine. In 2017, she was promoted to professor. In 2020, McClung became the director of the Center for Adolescent Reward, Rhythms and Sleep (CARRS).

== Research ==
=== Overview ===
McClung's research focuses on discovering, analyzing, and studying the molecular and biological mechanisms underlying psychiatric diseases such as drug addiction, schizophrenia, major depression, and bipolar disorder, with a primary interest in their association with circadian rhythms. During her Ph.D. McClung worked on using the fruit fly Drosophila melanogaster as a model system to study the genetics of drug sensitization. She later investigated the relationship between circadian rhythms and the development of psychiatric disorders. McClung has employed microarray technologies to examine gene expression changes in the mouse brain in the context of psychiatric disorders, particularly addiction. Notably, her work has demonstrated that mice with a mutated CLOCK gene exhibit behaviors similar to human mania, including hyperactivity, reduced anxiety, and increased reward-seeking for substances such as cocaine and sucrose. She also found that these mania-like behaviors can be reversed with chronic lithium treatment, mirroring therapeutic responses in humans with bipolar disorder. In addition to lithium, McClung demonstrated that Clock mutant mice also respond to valproate, further supporting face validity of the mouse model in bipolar disorder. McClung's research also aims to identify molecular components within the circadian system that may serve as potential targets for the development of novel psychiatric drugs. Furthermore, McClung's work demonstrates how circadian rhythms influence vulnerability and resilience to stress, offering vital insight into mood disorders.

=== Awards and honors ===
McClung has received numerous awards in recognition of her contributions to neuroscience and psychiatric research:

- 2005 & 2007 – NARSAD Young Investigator Award, Brain & Behavior Research Foundation (formerly National Alliance for Research on Schizophrenia & Depression).
- 2008 – Neuroscience of Brain Disorders Award, McKnight Foundation
- 2009 – Honorable Mention, Daniel X. Freedman Award for Outstanding Basic Research
- 2011 – Rising Star Award, International Mental Health Research Organization
- 2015 – Elected Fellow, American College of Neuropsychopharmacology
- 2016 – NARSAD Independent Investigator Award, Brain & Behavior Research Foundation
- 2019 – Outstanding Mentorship Award by the Psychiatry Department
- 2021 – Colvin Prize for Outstanding Achievement in Mood Disorders Research, Brain & Behavior Research Foundation

== Professional affiliations ==
Colleen McClung is a member of various neuroscience societies through which she has contributed her expertise and research from psychiatry and circadian rhythms:

- Society for Neuroscience (Member)
- Society for Research on Biological Rhythms (Member)
- Molecular Psychiatry Association (Member)
- NIDA funded Center for Adolescent Reward, Rhythms and Sleep, CARRS, (Co-director)
- American College of Neuropsychopharmacology (Fellow)

== Selected publications ==
- Berton, Olivier; McClung, Colleen A.; DiLeone, Ralph J.; Krishnan, Vaishnav; Renthal, William; Russo, Scott J.; Graham, Danielle; Tsankova, Nadia M.; Bolanos, Carlos A.; Rios, Maribel; Monteggia, Lisa M.; Self, David W.; Nestler, Eric J. (2006-02-10). "Essential Role of BDNF in the Mesolimbic Dopamine Pathway in Social Defeat Stress". Science. 311 (5762): 864–868. Bibcode:2006Sci...311..864B. doi:10.1126/science.1120972. ISSN 0036-8075. PMID 16469931. S2CID 32965598.
- Roybal, Kole; Theobold, David; Graham, Ami; DiNieri, Jennifer A.; Russo, Scott J.; Krishnan, Vaishnav; Chakravarty, Sumana; Peevey, Joseph; Oehrlein, Nathan; Birnbaum, Shari; Vitaterna, Martha H.; Orsulak, Paul; Takahashi, Joseph S.; Nestler, Eric J.; Carlezon, William A. (2007-04-10). "Mania-like behavior induced by disruption of CLOCK". Proceedings of the National Academy of Sciences. 104 (15): 6406–6411. doi:10.1073/pnas.0609625104. ISSN 0027-8424. PMC 1851061. PMID 17379666.
- McClung, Colleen A; Nestler, Eric J (2003). "Regulation of gene expression and cocaine reward by CREB and ΔFosB". Nature Neuroscience. 6 (11): 1208–1215. doi:10.1038/nn1143. ISSN 1097-6256. PMID 14566342. S2CID 38115726.
- McClung, Colleen A. (2007-05-01). "Circadian genes, rhythms and the biology of mood disorders". Pharmacology & Therapeutics. 114 (2): 222–232. doi:10.1016/j.pharmthera.2007.02.003. ISSN 0163-7258. PMC 1925042. PMID 17395264.
- McClung, Colleen A.; Sidiropoulou, Kyriaki; Vitaterna, Martha; Takahashi, Joseph S.; White, Francis J.; Cooper, Donald C.; Nestler, Eric J. (2005-06-28). "Regulation of dopaminergic transmission and cocaine reward by the Clock gene". Proceedings of the National Academy of Sciences. 102 (26): 9377–9381. Bibcode:2005PNAS..102.9377M. doi:10.1073/pnas.0503584102. ISSN 0027-8424. PMC 1166621. PMID 15967985.
- Arey, R., Enwright III, J.F., Spencer, S., Falcon, E., Ozburn, A.R., and McClung, C.A. (2013) An important role for Cholecystokinin, a CLOCK target gene, in the development and treatment of manic-like behaviors. Molecular Psychiatry, 19: 342-350.
- Ozburn, A.R., Falcon, E., Twaddle, A., Nugent, A.L., Gillman, A.G., Spencer, S.M., Arey, R.N., Mukherjee, S., Lyons-Weiler, J., Self, D.W., and McClung, C.A. (2014) Direct regulation of diurnal Drd3 expression and cocaine reward by NPAS2. Biological Psychiatry 77:425-33
- Sidor, M.M., Spencer, S., Dzirasa, K., Parekh, P.K., Tye, K.M., Warden, M.R., Arey, R.N., Enwright III, J.F., Jacobsen, J.P.R., Kumar, S., Remillard, E.M., Caron, M.G., Deisseroth, K., and McClung, C.A. (2015) Daytime spikes in dopaminergic activity underlie rapid mood-cycling. Molecular Psychiatry, 20:1479-80.
- Chen, C.Y., Logan, R.W., Tianzhou, M., Lewis, D.A., Tseng, G.C., Sibille, E., and McClung, C.A. (2016) The effects of aging on circadian patterns of gene expression in the human prefrontal cortex. Proc Natl Acad Sci, USA, 113:206-11.
- Parekh, P.K., Becker-Krail, D., Sundaravelu, P., Ishigaki, S., Okado, H., Sobue, G., Huang, Y., and McClung, C.A. (2017) Altered GluA1 function and accumbal synaptic plasticity in the Clockdelta19 model of bipolar mania. Biological Psychiatry, in press.
- Vadnie, C. A., & McClung, C. A. (2017). Circadian Rhythm Disturbances in Mood Disorders: Insights into the Role of the Suprachiasmatic Nucleus. Neural plasticity, 2017, 1504507.
- Logan, R. W., & McClung, C. A. (2019). Rhythms of life: circadian disruption and brain disorders across the lifespan. Nature reviews. Neuroscience, 20(1), 49–65.
- Ketchesin, K. D., Zong, W., Hildebrand, M. A., Scott, M. R., Seney, M. L., Cahill, K. M., Shankar, V. G., Glausier, J. R., Lewis, D. A., Tseng, G. C., & McClung, C. A. (2023). Diurnal Alterations in Gene Expression Across Striatal Subregions in Psychosis. Biological psychiatry, 93(2), 137–148.
