= CAB gene =

Protein-coding gene in plants

The chlorophyll a/b-binding protein gene, otherwise known as the CAB gene, is one of the most thoroughly characterized clock-regulated genes in plants. There are a variety of CAB proteins that are derived from this gene family. Studies on Arabidopsis plants have shed light on the mechanisms of biological clocks under the regulation of CAB genes. Dr. Steve Kay discovered that CAB was regulated by a circadian clock, which switched the gene on in the morning and off in the late afternoon. The genes code for proteins that associate with chlorophyll and xanthophylls. This association aids the absorption of sunlight, which transfers energy to photosystem II to drive photosynthetic electron transport.

== Discovery ==
Critical research on the clock components and mechanisms involving genetic studies proliferated in the late 1900s. Dr. Steve Kay is a chronobiologist who developed novel methods for real time examination of daily gene expression and studied the circadian gene expression in plants further. He discovered that CAB was regulated by a circadian clock, which switched the gene on in the morning and off in the late afternoon. As a German botanist who focused on molecular plant physiology, Klaus Kloppstech discovered the potential regulation of circadian rhythm in peas by transcripts of chlorophyll a/b binding protein (LHCB/CAB). The transcripts' abundance fluctuation correlates to the circadian rhythm in peas. CAB, the subunit of ribulose-1,5-bisphosphate carboxylase/oxygenase, is light-induced. The replicated study in wheat showed that circadian rhythm regulates the CAB1 gene's transcription rate. Later, the mechanism of the CAB gene was studied in Arabidopsis thaliana and it was shown that both CAB1 and CAB2 genes transcription are circadian regulated. Due to its fit for positional gene cloning, Arabidopsis thaliana received wide recognition as a potent organism to study with forward genetics and gene cloning and was gradually developed into a model organism for studying biological clocks in plants. The result showed that the CAB gene displayed circadian control for transcription rate and accumulation of Arabidopsis CAB and many other genes.

== Function ==
The Cab gene, responsible for encoding the chlorophyll a/b-binding protein in Arabidopsis, plays a crucial role in the absorption of excitation energy necessary for photosynthetic mechanisms in plants. Its rapid induction upon exposure to light. In continuous light, the gene has been shown to trigger robust circadian rhythms in seedlings.

=== Mechanism ===
The circadian clock interacts with a specific phototransduction pathway that involves the CAB2 promoter. One proposed mechanism implicates transcription factors that are under circadian control. The -111 to -38 region sequence of the CAB promote in Arabidopsis contains special motifs. It includes a CCAAT box and three GATA motifs. The orientations and spacing of these motifs are conserved in CAB promoters across many species. A protein called CAB GATA factor 1 (CGT-1) binds to the GATA repeats and promotes CAB2 production. A mutation that prevents CGT-1 and GATA binding results in reduced CAB2 production.

A different proposed mechanism suggests calcium ion plays a role in CAB gene regulation. The reciprocal control model suggests gene expression is upregulated in a calcium/calmodulin-dependent manner. Transcription levels are dampened via a cGMP-dependent pathway, which is under circadian control, leading to a rhythmic flux of CAB expression that responds to light.

Beyond regulation via photo cytochrome input, specific CAB genes can be independently regulated via blue light input. In Arabidopsis, CAB1 is regulated through a blue light system. CAB1 mRNA levels increase following exposure to the blue light. Other gene subtypes, such as CAB2 and CAB3, are not regulated by blue light. There are distinct, but related, pathways involving blue light and phytochromes that affect CAB regulation.

=== Chronobiology ===
Because the expression of the CAB mRNA is rhythmic, it is often used as a marker for circadian rhythm in plants. CAB is confined to the mesophyll and guard cells and the cycling of CAB expression in the Arabidopsis plant suggests that there is a circadian clock that controls the CAB gene. When the plants were moved from light/dark cycles to constant darkness, CAB2 and CAB3 genes showed an exaggerated circadian cycling. Presence of various rhythms in plants suggests that there are many copies of the circadian clock in the plant circadian system, CAB genes are only a subset of these clocks. In light-dark cycles with long photoperiods, CAB expression is delayed because of the entrainment of the circadian oscillator that controls the expression of CAB. A study done comparing the rhythms of CAB with a photoreceptor gene Phytochrome B (PHYB), the most abundant photoreceptor in plants, showed that PHYB had a longer free-running period than CAB expression. Though there is a difference in the period between CAB and Phytochrome B (PHYB), there are many similarities in the circadian clocks that control the expression of each gene, including photoreceptors and clock-related genes, which indicates some overlap in the biochemical mechanisms.

Steady-state mRNA levels of the CAB2 and CAB3 genes showed a dramatic circadian cycling in plants shifted from light/dark cycles to constant darkness, whereas the cable mRNA level exhibited little or no cycling under the same conditions.

== Application of Research ==
=== Contribution in space biology ===
The purpose of researching plant space biology is to investigate how plants are affected by the space environment. The data obtained from studying Arabidopsis plant's biological responses can be used to improve and innovate aerospace hardware, reducing the impact of engineering on living organism. Additionally, molecular genetic tools are being utilized to study how spaceflight affects plants, and these studies could lead to a better understanding of aerospace biology.

Research on Arabidopsis plants, using DNA microarrays, has shown that wide-scale genome expression changes can occur in the spaceflight environment. Further analysis using quantitative RT-PCR confirmed that the expression of CAB 4.9, a subset of CAB genes, was significantly suppressed in spaceflight samples compared to ground control samples. CAB genes are known to respond to temperature and light separately, so better environmental control of hardware management would help eliminate these gene expression differences by mitigating simple environmental challenges such as lighting and heat exchange. By monitoring these biological responses, scientists and engineers can gain insight into hardware development. Moreover, this further suggests that environmental factors can affect gene expression.
