= Nam-Hai Chua =

Singaporean botanist

Nam-Hai Chua FRS (Chinese: 蔡南海; pinyin: Cài Nánhǎi) (born 8 April 1944) is a Singaporean botanist. He is an Andrew W. Mellon Emeritus Professor at Rockefeller University. He is now deputy chairman of Temasek Life Science Laboratory.

== Life ==
Chua earned a Bachelor of Science (B.S.) from the National University of Singapore, and then a Master of Arts (M.A.) and Ph.D. from Harvard University in 1969. He taught at the University of Singapore Medical School, from 1969 to 1971. He was awarded the International Prize for Biology in 2005. He joined Rockefeller University in 1973 and remained there till his retirement from the university. Thereafter, he moved back to Singapore briefly in 2016.

== Awards and honors ==
- Royal Society of London (1988)
- Taiwan Academica Sinica (1988)
- Chinese Academy of Sciences (2006)
- Honorary Doctorate from NTU Singapore (2008)
- Singapore National Science and Technology Gold Medal (1998)
- Singapore Public Administration Gold Medal (2002)
- International Prize in Biology (2005)
- NUS Distinguished Alumni Service Award 2017
- Recognized as a Pioneer Member of the American Society of Plant Biologists.
