= PDF (gene) =

Protein-coding gene in the species Homo sapiens

Available structures
PDB	Ortholog search: PDBe RCSB
PDB	List of PDB id codes 3G5K, 3G5P

Identifiers
- Aliases: PDF, peptide deformylase (mitochondrial), peptide deformylase, mitochondrial
- External IDs: MGI: 1915273; HomoloGene: 69354; GeneCards: PDF; OMA:PDF - orthologs

Gene location (Human)
Chr.	Chromosome 16 (human)
Band	16q22.1	Start	69,326,913 bp
Band	16q22.1	End	69,330,588 bp

Gene location (Mouse)
Chr.	Chromosome 8 (mouse)
Band	8|8 D3	Start	107,771,330 bp
Band	8|8 D3	End	107,775,246 bp
RNA expression pattern
Bgee	Human / Mouse (ortholog); Top expressed in: testicle; gonad; human kidney; right lobe of liver; stromal cell of endometrium; gastrocnemius muscle; mucosa of transverse colon; muscle of thigh; skeletal muscle tissue; right adrenal gland / Top expressed in: quadriceps femoris muscle; proximal tubule; right kidney; muscle tissue; skeletal muscle tissue; muscle of thigh; heart; adrenal gland; embryo; liver; More reference expression data
BioGPS	n/a
Gene ontology
Molecular function	hydrolase activity; metal ion binding; peptide deformylase activity
Cellular component	mitochondrion
Biological process	peptidyl-methionine modification; N-terminal protein amino acid modification; protein biosynthesis; positive regulation of cell population proliferation; co-translational protein modification
Sources:Amigo / QuickGO
Orthologs
Species	Human	Mouse
Entrez	64146	68023
Ensembl	ENSG00000258429	ENSMUSG00000078931
UniProt	Q9HBH1	S4R2K0
RefSeq (mRNA)	NM_022341	NM_026513
RefSeq (protein)	NP_071736	NP_080789
Location (UCSC)	Chr 16: 69.33 – 69.33 Mb	Chr 8: 107.77 – 107.78 Mb
PubMed search
- Wikidata
View/Edit Human	View/Edit Mouse

Peptide deformylase, mitochondrial is an enzyme that in humans is encoded by the PDF gene.
