= NPAS2 =

Protein-coding gene in the species Homo sapiens

Identifiers
- Aliases: NPAS2, MOP4, PASD4, bHLHe9, neuronal PAS domain protein 2
- External IDs: OMIM: 603347; MGI: 109232; GeneCards: NPAS2

Gene location (Human)
| Chr. | Chromosome 2 (human) |
| Band | 2q11.2 | Start | 100,820,139 bp |
| Band | 2q11.2 | End | 100,996,829 bp |

Gene location (Mouse)
| Chr. | Chromosome 1 (mouse) |
| Band | 1 B|1 17.98 cM | Start | 39,232,812 bp |
| Band | 1 B|1 17.98 cM | End | 39,402,317 bp |
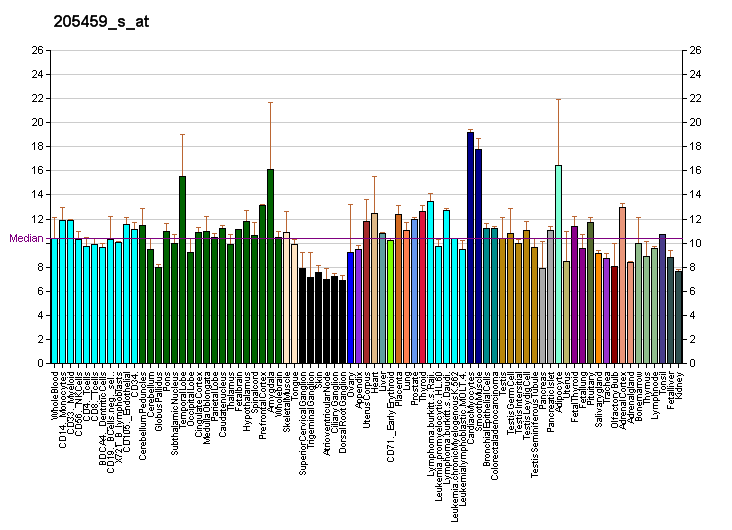

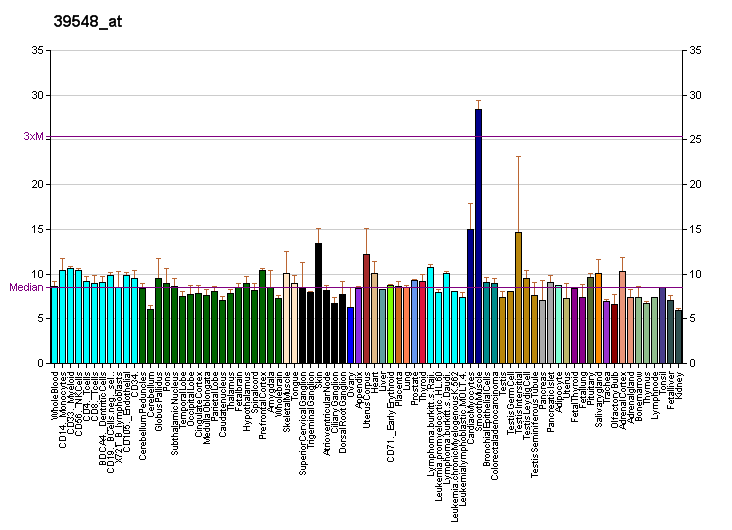

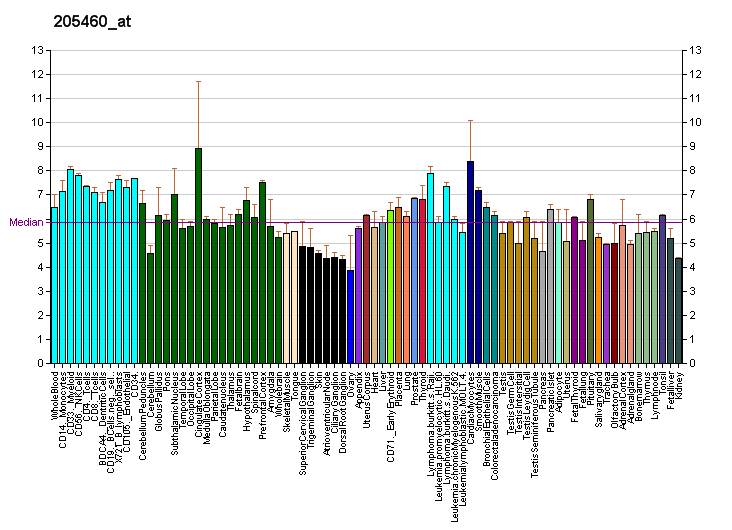
RNA expression pattern
| Bgee | Human / Mouse (ortholog); Top expressed in: body of pancreas; apex of heart; body of stomach; left ventricle; skin of leg; right auricle of heart; skin of abdomen; prefrontal cortex; olfactory zone of nasal mucosa; right frontal lobe / Top expressed in: ascending aorta; dorsal striatum; zygote; superior frontal gyrus; lumbar subsegment of spinal cord; olfactory tubercle; secondary oocyte; nucleus accumbens; aortic valve; prefrontal cortex; More reference expression data |
| BioGPS | More reference expression data |
Gene ontology
| Molecular function | Hsp90 protein binding; protein dimerization activity; DNA-binding transcription factor activity; metal ion binding; protein binding; DNA binding; DNA-binding transcription factor activity, RNA polymerase II-specific; RNA polymerase II cis-regulatory region sequence-specific DNA binding |
| Cellular component | cytoplasm; transcription regulator complex; nucleus; nucleoplasm; cytosol |
| Biological process | regulation of transcription, DNA-templated; rhythmic process; positive regulation of DNA repair; negative regulation of cell death; circadian regulation of gene expression; transcription, DNA-templated; cellular response to DNA damage stimulus; response to redox state; positive regulation of transcription, DNA-templated; central nervous system development; circadian rhythm; regulation of response to DNA damage stimulus; positive regulation of transcription by RNA polymerase II; regulation of lipid metabolic process; positive regulation of behavioral fear response |
Sources:Amigo / QuickGO
Orthologs
| Databases | NCBI: entry; OMA: entry |
| Species | Human | Mouse |
| Entrez | 4862 | 18143 |
| Ensembl | ENSG00000170485 | ENSMUSG00000026077 |
| UniProt | Q99743 | P97460 |
| RefSeq (mRNA) | NM_002518 | NM_008719 |
| RefSeq (protein) | NP_002509 | NP_032745 |
| Location (UCSC) | Chr 2: 100.82 – 101 Mb | Chr 1: 39.23 – 39.4 Mb |
| PubMed search |
- Wikidata
| View/Edit Human | View/Edit Mouse |

Neuronal PAS domain protein 2 (NPAS2) also known as member of PAS protein 4 (MOP4) is a transcription factor protein that in humans is encoded by the NPAS2 gene. NPAS2 is paralogous to CLOCK, and both are key proteins involved in the maintenance of circadian rhythms in mammals. In the brain, NPAS2 functions as a generator and maintainer of mammalian circadian rhythms. More specifically, NPAS2 is an activator of transcription and translation of core clock and clock-controlled genes through its role in a negative feedback loop in the suprachiasmatic nucleus (SCN), the brain region responsible for the control of circadian rhythms.

== Discovery ==
The mammalian and mouse Npas2 gene was first sequenced and characterized in 1997 Dr. Steven McKnight's lab and published by Yu-Dong Zhou et al. The gene’s cDNAs encoding mouse and human forms of NPAS2 were isolated and sequenced. RNA blotting assays were used to demonstrate the selective presence of the gene in brain and spinal cord tissues of mice. In situ hybridization indicated that the pattern of Npas2 mRNA distribution in mouse brain is broad and complex, and is largely non-overlapping with that of Npas1.

Using Immunohistochemistry of human testis, Ramasamy et al. (2015) found the presence of NPAS2 protein in both germ cells within the tubules of the testes and in the interstitial space of Leydig cells.

== Structure ==
=== In humans ===
The Npas2 gene resides on chromosome 2 at the band q13. The gene is 176,679 bases long and contains 25 exons. The predicted 824-amino acid human NPAS2 protein shares 87% sequence identity with mouse Npas2.

=== In mice ===
The Npas2 gene has been found to reside on chromosome 1 at 17.98 centimorgans and is 169,505 bases long.

== Function ==
=== In the brain ===
The NPAS2 protein is a member of the basic helix-loop-helix (bHLH)-PAS transcription factor family and is expressed in the SCN. NPAS2 is a PAS domain-containing protein, which binds other proteins via their own protein-protein (PAS) binding domains. Like its paralogue, CLOCK (another PAS domain-containing protein), the NPAS2 protein can dimerize with the BMAL1 protein and engage in a transcription/translation negative feedback loop (TTFL) to activate transcription of the mammalian Per and Cry core clock genes. NPAS2 has been shown to form a heterodimer with BMAL1 in both the brain and in cell lines, suggesting its similarity in function to the CLOCK protein in this TTFL.

Compensation is a key feature of TTFLs that regulate circadian rhythms. BMAL1 compensates for CLOCK in that if CLOCK is absent, BMAL1 will upregulate to maintain the mammalian circadian rhythms. NPAS2 has been shown to be analogous to the function of CLOCK in CLOCK-deficient mice. In Clock knockout mice, NPAS2 is upregulated to keep the rhythms intact. Npas2-mutant mice, which do not express functional NPAS2 protein, still maintain robust circadian rhythms in locomotion. However, like CLOCK-deficient mice in the CLOCK/BMAL1 TTFL, Npas2-mutant mice (in the NPAS2/BMAL1 TTFL) still have small defects in their circadian rhythms such as a shortened circadian period and an altered response to changes in the typical light-dark cycle. In addition, Npas2 knockout mice show sleep disturbances and have decreased expression of mPer2 in their forebrains. Mice without functional alleles of both Clock and Npas2 became arrhythmic once placed in constant darkness, suggesting that both genes have overlapping roles in maintaining circadian rhythms. In both wild-type and Clock knockout mice, Npas2 expression is observed at the same levels, confirming that Npas2 plays a role in maintaining these rhythms in the absence of Clock.

=== In other tissues ===
Npas2 is expressed everywhere in the periphery of the body. Special focus has been given to its function in liver tissues, and its mRNA is upregulated in Clock-mutant mice. However, studies have shown that Npas2 alone is unable to maintain circadian rhythms in peripheral tissues in the absence of CLOCK protein, unlike in the SCN. One theory to explain this observation is that neurons in the brain are characterized by intercellular coupling and can thus respond to deficiencies in key clock proteins in nearby neurons to maintain rhythms. In peripheral tissues such as the liver and lung, however, the lack of intercellular coupling does not allow for this compensatory mechanism to occur. A second theory as to why NPAS2 can maintain rhythms in CLOCK-deficient SCNs but not in CLOCK-deficient peripheral tissues, is that there exists an additional unknown factor in the SCN that is not present in peripheral tissues.

=== Non-circadian function ===
NPAS2-deficient mice have been shown to have long-term memory deficits, suggesting that the protein may play a key role in the acquisition of such memories. This theory was tested by inserting a reporter gene (lacZ) that resulted in the production of an NPAS2 protein lacking the bHLH domain. These mice were then given several tests, including the cued and contextual fear task, and showed long-term memory deficits in both tasks.

== Interactions ==
NPAS2 has been shown to interact with:

- ARNTL (also known as BMAL1). Like Clock, Npas2 mRNA cycles with a similar phase to that of Bmal1, with both peaking 8 hours before the peak of Per2 mRNA expression. This is consistent with the observation that NPAS2 forms a heterodimer with BMAL1 to drive Per2 expression.
- EP300. NPAS2 and EP300 interact in a time-dependent, synchronized manner. EP300 is recruited to NPAS2 as a coactivator of clock gene expression.
- Retinoic acid receptor alpha (RARα) and retinoid X receptor alpha (RXRα). In peripheral clocks, RARα and RXRα interact with NPAS2 by inhibiting the NPAS2:BMAL1 heterodimer-mediated expression of clock genes. This interaction depends upon humoral signaling by retinoic acid and serves to phase-shift the clock.
- Small heterodimer partner (SHP). In the liver circadian clock, NPAS2 and SHP engage in a TTFL: NPAS2 controls the circadian rhythms of SHP by rhythmically binding to its promoter, while SHP inhibits transcription of Npas2 when present.

== Clinical significance ==
Npas2 genotypes can be determined through tissue samples from which genomic DNA is extracted and assayed. The assay is performed under PCR conditions and can be used to determine specific mutations and polymorphisms.

=== Polymorphisms and tumorigenesis ===
Mounting evidence suggests that the NPAS2 protein and other circadian genes are involved in tumorigenesis and tumor growth, possibly through their control of cancer-related biologic pathways. A missense polymorphism in NPAS2 (Ala394Thr) has been shown to be associated with risk of human tumors including breast cancer. These findings provide evidence suggesting a possible role for the circadian Npas2 gene in cancer prognosis. These results have been confirmed in both breast and colorectal cancers.

=== NPAS2 and mood disorders ===
Current research has revealed an association between seasonal affective disorder (SAD) and general mood disorder related to NPAS2, ARNTL, and CLOCK polymorphisms. These genes may influence seasonal variations through metabolic factors such as body weight and appetite.

Associated with a connection to mood disorders, NPAS2 has been found to be involved with dopamine degradation. This was first suggested by the observation that the clock components BMAL1 and NPAS2 transcriptionally activated a luciferase reporter driven by the murine monoamine oxidase A (MAOA) promoter in a circadian fashion. This suggested that these two clock components (BMAL1 and NPAS2) directly regulated MAOA transcription. Subsequent findings discovered positive transcriptional regulation of BMAL1/NPAS2 by PER2. In mice lacking PER2, both MAOA mRNA and MAOA protein levels were decreased. Therefore, dopamine degradation was reduced, and dopamine levels in the nucleus accumbens were increased. These findings indicate that degradation of monoamines is regulated by the circadian clock. It is very likely that the described clock-mediated regulation of monoamines is relevant for humans, because single-nucleotide polymorphisms in Per2, Bmal1, and Npas2 are associated in an additive fashion with seasonal affective disorder or winter depression.

== See also ==
- Clock (gene)
- Bmal1/Arntl (gene)
- Suprachiasmatic nucleus (SCN)
- Per (gene)
- Steven McKnight (scientist)
