= Basic helix-loop-helix ARNT-like protein 1 =

Human protein and coding gene

BMAL1

Identifiers
- Aliases: BMAL1, BMAL1c, JAP3, MOP3, PASD3, TIC, bHLHe5, aryl hydrocarbon receptor nuclear translocator like, ARNTL
- External IDs: OMIM: 602550; MGI: 1096381; GeneCards: BMAL1
Available structures
PDB	Ortholog search: PDBe RCSB
PDB	List of PDB id codes 4H10

Gene location (Mouse)
Chr.	Chromosome 7 (mouse)
Band	7 F1|7 59.17 cM	Start	112,806,672 bp
Band	7 F1|7 59.17 cM	End	112,913,333 bp
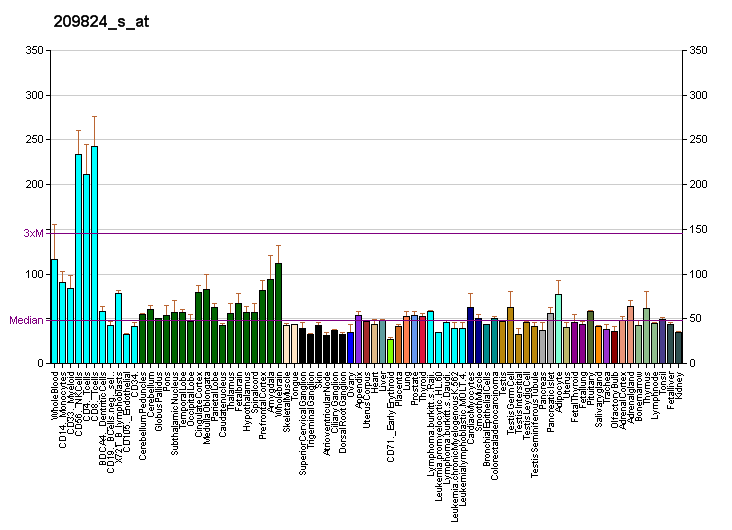

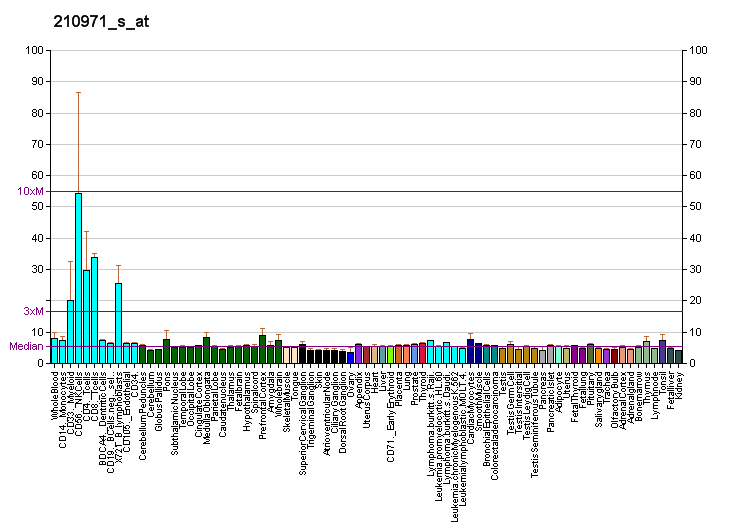
RNA expression pattern
Bgee	Human / Mouse (ortholog); n/a / Top expressed in: zygote; secondary oocyte; neural layer of retina; muscle of thigh; primary oocyte; thymus; sternocleidomastoid muscle; suprachiasmatic nucleus; temporal muscle; triceps brachii muscle
BioGPS	More reference expression data
Gene ontology
Molecular function	DNA binding; Hsp90 protein binding; protein dimerization activity; DNA-binding transcription factor activity; aryl hydrocarbon receptor binding; protein binding; transcription cis-regulatory region binding; transcription factor activity, RNA polymerase II core promoter proximal region sequence-specific binding; core promoter sequence-specific DNA binding; bHLH transcription factor binding; sequence-specific DNA binding; protein heterodimerization activity; E-box binding; DNA-binding transcription factor activity, RNA polymerase II-specific; RNA polymerase II cis-regulatory region sequence-specific DNA binding; DNA-binding transcription activator activity, RNA polymerase II-specific
Cellular component	cytoplasm; PML body; intracellular membrane-bounded organelle; transcription regulator complex; nucleoplasm; nucleus; nuclear body; chromatoid body
Biological process	regulation of transcription, DNA-templated; rhythmic process; transcription, DNA-templated; regulation of hair cycle; transcription by RNA polymerase II; spermatogenesis; circadian rhythm; negative regulation of TOR signaling; circadian regulation of gene expression; regulation of protein catabolic process; positive regulation of circadian rhythm; proteasome-mediated ubiquitin-dependent protein catabolic process; negative regulation of fat cell differentiation; negative regulation of transcription, DNA-templated; positive regulation of transcription, DNA-templated; positive regulation of transcription by RNA polymerase II; regulation of neurogenesis; regulation of insulin secretion; regulation of cell cycle; response to redox state; maternal process involved in parturition; positive regulation of canonical Wnt signaling pathway; oxidative stress-induced premature senescence; regulation of type B pancreatic cell development; negative regulation of glucocorticoid receptor signaling pathway; regulation of cellular senescence; positive regulation of skeletal muscle cell differentiation; positive regulation of protein acetylation; negative regulation of cold-induced thermogenesis; protein import into nucleus
Sources:Amigo / QuickGO
Orthologs
Databases	NCBI: entry; OMA: entry
Species	Human	Mouse
Entrez	406	11865
Ensembl	ENSG00000133794	ENSMUSG00000055116
UniProt	O00327	Q9WTL8
RefSeq (mRNA)	NM_001030272; NM_001030273; NM_001178; NM_001297719; NM_001297722 NM_001297724	NM_001243048; NM_007489; NM_001357070; NM_001368412; NM_001374642
RefSeq (protein)	NP_001025443; NP_001025444; NP_001169; NP_001284648; NP_001284651 NP_001284653; NP_001338733; NP_001338734; NP_001338735; NP_001338736; NP_001338737; NP_001338738; NP_001338739; NP_001338740; NP_001338741; NP_001338742; NP_001338743; NP_001338744; NP_001338745; NP_001338746; NP_001338747; NP_001338748; NP_001338749; NP_001338750; NP_001338751; NP_001338752; NP_001338753	NP_001229977; NP_031515; NP_001343999; NP_001355341; NP_001361571
Location (UCSC)	n/a	Chr 7: 112.81 – 112.91 Mb
PubMed search
- Wikidata
View/Edit Human	View/Edit Mouse

Basic helix-loop-helix ARNT-like protein 1 or aryl hydrocarbon receptor nuclear translocator-like protein 1 (ARNTL), or brain and muscle ARNT-like 1 is a protein that in humans is encoded by the BMAL1 gene on chromosome 11, region p15.3. It's also known as MOP3, and, less commonly, bHLHe5, BMAL, BMAL1C, JAP3, PASD3, and TIC.

BMAL1 encodes a transcription factor with a basic helix-loop-helix (bHLH) and two PAS domains. The human BMAL1 gene has a predicted 24 exons, located on the p15 band of the 11th chromosome. The BMAL1 protein is 626 amino acids long and plays a key role as one of the positive elements in the mammalian auto-regulatory transcription-translation negative feedback loop (TTFL), which is responsible for generating molecular circadian rhythms. Research has revealed that BMAL1 is the only clock gene without which the circadian clock fails to function in humans. BMAL1 has also been identified as a candidate gene for susceptibility to hypertension, diabetes, and obesity, and mutations in BMAL1 have been linked to infertility, gluconeogenesis and lipogenesis problems, and altered sleep patterns. BMAL1, according to genome-wide profiling, is estimated to target more than 150 sites in the human genome, including all of the clock genes and genes encoding for proteins that regulate metabolism.

== History ==
The BMAL1 gene was originally discovered in 1997 by two groups of researchers, John B. Hogenesch et al. in March under the name MOP3 and Ikeda and Nomura in April as part of a superfamily of PAS domain transcription factors. In 1998, Hogenesch's additional characterization of MOP3 revealed that its role as the partner of bHLH-PAS transcription factor CLOCK was essential to mammalian circadian clock function. The MOP3 protein, as it was originally known by the Hogenesch group, was found to dimerize with MOP4, CLOCK, and hypoxia-inducible factors. The names BMAL1 and ARNTL were adopted in later papers. One of BMAL1 protein's earliest discovered functions in circadian regulation was related to the CLOCK-BMAL1 (CLOCK-ARNTL) heterodimer, which would bind through an E-box enhancer to activate the transcription of the AVP gene which encodes for vasopressin. However, the gene's importance in circadian rhythms was not fully realized until the knockout of the gene in mice showed complete loss of circadian rhythms in locomotion and other behaviors.

== Genetics ==
=== Regulation of Bmal1 activity ===
SIRT1 regulates PER protein degradation by inhibiting transcriptional activity of the BMAL1:CLOCK heterodimer in a circadian manner through deacetylation. The degradation of PER proteins prevents the formation of the large protein complex, and thus disinhibits the transcriptional activity of the BMAL1:CLOCK heterodimer. The CRY protein is also signaled for degradation by poly-ubiquitination from the FBXL3 protein resulting in the disinhibition of BMAL1:CLOCK heterodimer activity.

In addition to the circadian regulatory TTFL loop, Bmal1 transcription is regulated by competitive binding to the retinoic acid-related orphan receptor response element-binding site (RORE) within the promoter of Bmal1. The CLOCK/BMAL1 heterodimer also binds to E-box elements in promoter regions of Rev-Erbα and RORα/β genes, upregulating transcription and translation of REV-ERB and ROR proteins. REV-ERBα and ROR proteins regulate BMAL1 expression through a secondary feedback loop and compete to bind to Rev-Erb/ROR response elements in the Bmal1 promoter, resulting in BMAL1 expression repressed by REV-ERBα and activated by ROR proteins. Other nuclear receptors of the same families (NR1D2 (Rev-erb-β); NR1F2 (ROR-β); and NR1F3 (ROR-γ)) have also been shown to act on Bmal1 transcriptional activity in a similar manner.

Several posttranslational modifications of BMAL1 dictate the timing of the CLOCK/BMAL1 feedback loops. Phosphorylation of BMAL1 targets it for ubiquitination and degradation, as well as deubiquitination and stabilization. Acetylation of BMAL1 recruits CRY1 to suppress the transactivation of CLOCK/BMAL1. The sumoylation of BMAL1 by small ubiquitin-related modifier 3 signals its ubiquitination in the nucleus, leading to transactivation of the CLOCK/BMAL1 heterodimer. CLOCK/BMAL1 transactivation, is activated by phosphorylation by casein kinase 1ε and inhibited by phosphorylation by MAPK. Phosphorylation by CK2α regulates BMAL1 intracellular localization and phosphorylation by GSK3B controls BMAL1 stability and primes it for ubiquitination.

In 2004, Rora was discovered to be an activator of Bmal1 transcription within the suprachiasmatic nucleus (SCN), regulated by its core clock. Rora was found to be required for normal Bmal1 expression as well as consolidation of daily locomotor activity. This suggests that the opposing activities of the orphan nuclear receptors RORA and REV-ERBα, the latter of which represses Bmal1 expression, are important in the maintenance of circadian clock function. Currently, Rora is under investigation for its link to autism, which may be a consequence of its function as a circadian regulator.

Summary of regulation of Bmal1 activity
Bmal1 Regulator/Modifier	Positive Or Negative Regulator	Direct or Indirect	Mechanism	Source(s)
SIRT1	Negative	Direct	BMAL1:CLOCK heterodimer deacetylation	
FBXL3	Positive	Indirect	Poly-ubiquitination of PER promotes PER degradation	
REV-ERBα/β	Negative	Direct	Repression by binding Bmal1 promoter	
ROR-α/β/γ	Positive	Direct	Activation by binding Bmal1 promoter	
Acetylation	Negative	Direct	Recruits CRY1 to inhibit the BMAL1:CLOCK heterodimer	
Small ubiquitin-related modifier 3	Positive	Direct	Sumoylation of BMAL1	
Casein kinase 1ε	Positive	Direct	Phosphorylation of the CLOCK/BMAL1 heterodimer	
MAPK	Negative	Direct	Phosphorylation of the CLOCK/BMAL1 heterodimer	
CK2α	Unclear	Direct	Phosphorylation of BMAL1	
GSK3B	Positive	Direct	Phosphorylation of BMAL1	

=== Species distribution ===
Along with mammals such as humans and mice, orthologs of the Arntl gene are also found in fish (AF144690.1), birds (Arntl), reptiles, amphibians (XI.2098), and Drosophila (Cycle, which encodes a protein lacking the homologous C-terminal domain, but still dimerizes with the CLOCK protein). Unlike mammalian Arntl, circadian regulated, the Drosophila Cycle (gene) is constitutively expressed. In humans, three transcript variants encoding two different isoforms have been found for this gene. The importance of these transcript variants is unknown.

=== Mutations and disease ===
The Arntl gene is located within the hypertension susceptibility loci of chromosome 1 in rats. A study of single nucleotide polymorphisms (SNPs) within this loci found two polymorphisms that occurred in the sequence encoding for Arntl and were associated with type II diabetes and hypertension. When translated from a rat model to a human model, this research suggests a causative role of Arntl gene variation in the pathology of type II diabetes. Recent phenotype data also suggest this gene and its partner Clock play a role in the regulation of glucose homeostasis and metabolism, which can lead to hypoinsulinaemia or diabetes when disrupted.

In regards to other functions, another study shows that the CLOCK/BMAL1 complex upregulates human LDLR promoter activity, suggesting the Arntl gene also plays a role in cholesterol homeostasis. Furthermore, BMAL1 has been shown to influence excitability and seizure threshold. In addition, BMAL1 gene expression, along with that of other core clock genes, were discovered to be lower in patients with bipolar disorder, suggesting a problem with circadian function in these patients. An SNP in Bmal1 was identified as having a link with bipolar disorder. Arntl, Npas2, and Per2 have also been associated with seasonal affective disorder in humans. Alzheimer's patients have different rhythms in BMAL1 methylation suggesting that its misregulation contributes to cognitive deficits. Research has also shown that BMAL1 and other clock genes drive the expression of clock-controlled genes that are associated with Autism Spectrum Disorder (ASD). Lastly, BMAL1 has been identified through functional genetic screening as a putative regulator of the p53 tumor suppressor pathway suggesting potential involvement in the circadian rhythms exhibited by cancer cells.

In animal models of multiple sclerosis (MS), namely the experimental autoimmune encephalomyelitis (EAE) model, it has been shown that daily circadian rhythms can play an important role in disease pathology. Inducing EAE through the active immunization of mice with myelin oligodendrocyte glycoprotein (MOG) peptide during the rest phase is more efficient in comparison to that during the active phase. Disparity in EAE induction is critically dependent on BMAL1 expression in T cells and myeloid cells. T cell or myeloid-specific deletion of Bmal1 has been shown to cause more severe pathology and is sufficient to abolish the rest vs. active induction effect.

== Structure ==
The BMAL1 protein contains fours domains according to its crystallographic structure: a basic helix-loop-helix (bHLH) domain, two PAS domains called PAS-A and PAS-B, and a trans-activating domain. The dimerization of CLOCK:BMAL1 proteins involves strong interactions between the bHLH, PAS A, and PAS B domains of both CLOCK and BMAL1 and forms an asymmetrical heterodimer with three distinct protein interfaces. The PAS-A interactions between CLOCK and BMAL1 involves an interaction, in which an α-helix of CLOCK PAS-A and the β-sheet of BMAL1 PAS-A, and an α-helix motif of the BMAL1 PAS-A domain and the β-sheet of CLOCK PAS-A. CLOCK and BMAL1 PAS-B domains stack in a parallel fashion, resulting in the concealment of different hydrophobic residues on the β-sheet of BMAL1 PAS-B and the helical surface of CLOCK PAS-B, such as Tyr 310 and Phe 423. Key interactions with specific amino acid residues, specially CLOCK His 84 and BMAL1 Leu125, are important in the dimerization of these molecules.

== Function ==
=== Circadian clock ===
The protein encoded by the BMAL1 gene in mammals binds with a second bHLH-PAS protein via the PAS domain, CLOCK (or its paralog, NPAS2) to form a heterodimer in the nucleus. Via its BHLH domain, this heterodimer binds to E-box response elements in the promoter regions of Per (Per1 and Per2) and Cry genes (Cry1 and Cry2). This binding upregulates the transcription of Per1, Per2, Cry1 and Cry2 mRNAs.

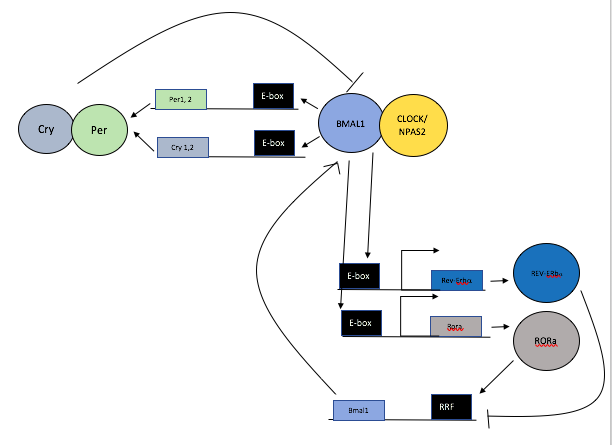
TTFL loops of Bmal1 activity

After the PER and CRY proteins have accumulated to sufficient levels, they interact by their PAS motifs to form a large repressor complex that travels into the nucleus to inhibit the transcriptional activity of the CLOCK:BMAL1 heterodimer This inhibits the heterodimer activation of the transcription of Per and Cry genes, and causes protein levels of PER and CRY drop. This transcription-translation negative feedback loop (TTFL) is modulated in the cytoplasm by phosphorylation of PER proteins by casein kinase 1ε or δ (CK1 ε or CK1 δ), targeting these proteins for degradation by the 26S proteasome. The TTFL loop of nocturnal mice transcription levels of the Bmal1 gene peak at CT18, during the mid-subjective night, anti-phase to the transcription levels of Per, Cry, and other clock control genes, which peak at CT6, during the mid-subjective day. This process occurs with a period length of approximately 24 hours and supports the notion that this molecular mechanism is rhythmic.

=== Pregnancy ===
Basic helix-loop-helix ARNT-like protein 1, or more commonly known as Bmal1, encodes for a transcriptional factor that when it heterodimerizes with Clock and Npas2 proteins, regulates gene expression for circadian rhythms via E-box elements. It dictates the timing of different physiological process by synchronizing them to environmental cues. The center of this orchestration is most notably, in mammals, the suprachiasmatic nucleus (SCN). Defects in Bmal1 result in disrupted circadian rhythms across different organ systems that are associated with sleep disorders, metabolic disorders, immune dysfunction and tumorigenesis. Bmal1's regulation in circadian rhythms influences reproductive physiology such as ovulation, fertilization, and embryonic and fetal development via maternal circadian communication. Studies have suggested mice that lack Bmal1 display reproductive ineffectiveness such as irregular cycles and reduced fertility. Shift work and chronic jet lag have been suggested to correlate with outcomes such as preterm labor, low birth weight, and gestational diabetes. Gene knockout models in mice have helped to understand the role Bmal1 has in transcriptional translational feedback loops and the effects of its absence on circadian rhythms and other physiological processes. These knockout models have helped in revealing new insights into individualistic healthcare and disease prevention.

== Knockout studies ==
The Arntl gene is an essential component within the mammalian clock gene regulatory network. It is a point of sensitivity within the network, as it is the only gene whose single knockout in a mouse model generates arrhythmicity at both the molecular and behavioral levels. In addition to defects in the clock, these Arntl-null mice also have reproductive problems, are small in stature, age quickly, and have progressive arthropathy that results in having less overall locomotor activity than wild type mice. However, recent research suggests that there might be some redundancy in the circadian function of Arntl with its paralog Bmal2. BMAL1 KO is not embryonically lethal and mice with BMAL1 ablated in adulthood do not express the symptoms of BMAL1 KO mice. A recent study finds that BMAL1 KO mice exhibit autistic-like behavioral changes, including impaired sociability, excessive stereotyped and repetitive behaviors, and motor learning disabilities. These changes are associated with hyperactivation of the mTOR signaling pathway in the brain and can be ameliorated by an antidiabetic drug metformin.

BMAL1 binding is regulated in a tissue-specific manner by numerous factors including non-circadian ones. Following, tissue-specific KOs cause unique effects. BMAL1 has been shown to be important in bone metabolism as osteoblast BMAL1 KO mice have lower bone mass than their wild type counterparts. It is also important for energy metabolism as BMAL1 modulates the regulation of hepatic metabolites, the secretion of insulin and proliferation of pancreatic islets, adipocyte differentiation and lipogenesis, and skeletal muscle glucose metabolism. Curiously, global KO of BMAL1 has no effect on food anticipatory activity (FAA) in mice but in BMAL1 deletions in certain regions in the hypothalamus outside the SCN eliminate FAA. Knockout studies have demonstrated that BMAL1 is a key mediator between the circadian clock and the immune system response. By loss of Ccl2 regulation, BMAL1 KO in myeloid cells results in hindered monocyte recruitment, pathogen clearance, and anti-inflammatory response (consistent with the arthropathy phenotype). Immune cells such as TNF-α and IL-1β reciprocally repress BMAL1 activity. Finally, BMAL1 interactions with HSF1 triggers clock synchronization and the release of pro-survival factors, highlighting the contribution of BMAL1 to cell stress and survival responses.

BMAL1 deficient hESC-derived cardiomyocytes exhibited typical phenotypes of dilated cardiomyopathy including attenuated contractility, calcium dysregulation, and disorganized myofilaments. In addition, mitochondrial fission and mitophagy were suppressed in BMAL1 deficient hESC-cardiomyocytes, which resulted in significantly attenuated mitochondrial oxidative phosphorylation and compromised cardiomyocyte function.

== Interactions ==
Arntl has been shown to interact with:

- Aryl hydrocarbon receptor
- CLOCK
- CREBBP
- CRY1
- EP300
- EPAS1
- HIF1A
- NPAS2
- SUMO3
- BNIP3
- TRIM28

== See also ==
- Arntl2 - Arntl2 (Bmal2) is a paralog of Arntl (Bmal1) that encodes for a basic helix-loop-helix PAS domain transcription factor. It, too, has been shown to play a circadian role, with its protein BMAL2 forming a transcriptionally active heterodimer with the CLOCK protein. It may also play a role in hypoxia.
- Cycle - Cycle is the Drosophila melanogaster ortholog of Arntl.
