= CLOCK =

Human protein and coding gene

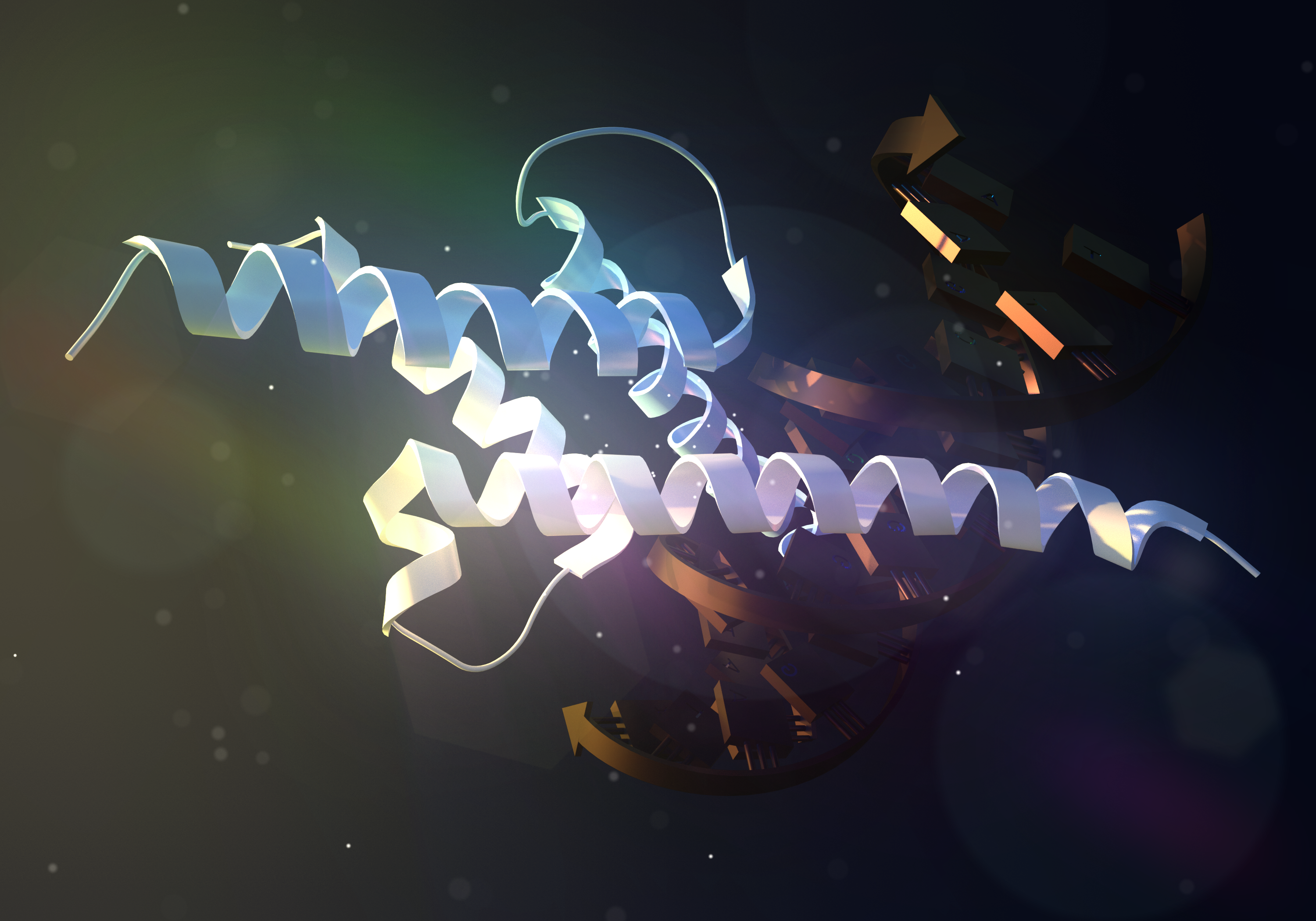

Identifiers
- Aliases: CLOCK, KAT13D, bHLHe8, clock circadian regulator
- External IDs: OMIM: 601851; MGI: 99698; GeneCards: CLOCK
Available structures
PDB	Ortholog search: PDBe RCSB
PDB	List of PDB id codes 4H10
Enzyme activity
EC #	BRENDA	ExPASy	KEGG	MetaCyc
2.3.1.48	↗	↗	↗	↗

Gene location (Human)
Chr.	Chromosome 4 (human)
Band	4q12	Start	55,427,903 bp
Band	4q12	End	55,546,909 bp

Gene location (Mouse)
Chr.	Chromosome 5 (mouse)
Band	5 C3.3|5 40.63 cM	Start	76,357,715 bp
Band	5 C3.3|5 40.63 cM	End	76,452,639 bp
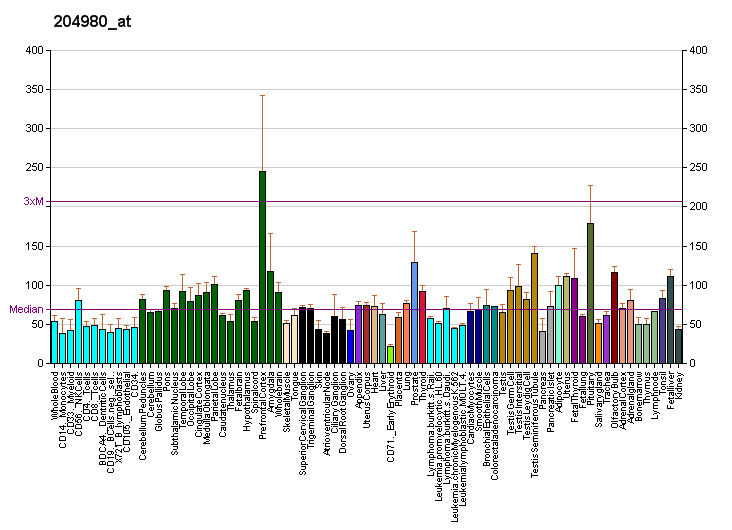
RNA expression pattern
Bgee	Human / Mouse (ortholog); Top expressed in: secondary oocyte; germinal epithelium; caput epididymis; tail of epididymis; retinal pigment epithelium; testicle; tibialis anterior muscle; tibia; gingival epithelium; lower lobe of lung / Top expressed in: retinal pigment epithelium; zygote; ciliary body; secondary oocyte; epithelium of lens; conjunctival fornix; skin of external ear; left colon; aorta; ascending aorta; More reference expression data
BioGPS	More reference expression data
Gene ontology
Molecular function	transferase activity; DNA binding; sequence-specific DNA binding; protein dimerization activity; DNA-binding transcription factor activity; histone acetyltransferase activity; RNA polymerase II cis-regulatory region sequence-specific DNA binding; transcription factor activity, RNA polymerase II core promoter proximal region sequence-specific binding; E-box binding; core promoter sequence-specific DNA binding; protein binding; chromatin DNA binding; acyltransferase activity; DNA-binding transcription factor activity, RNA polymerase II-specific; DNA-binding transcription activator activity, RNA polymerase II-specific
Cellular component	cytoplasm; chromatoid body; intracellular membrane-bounded organelle; transcription regulator complex; chromosome; nucleoplasm; nucleus; cytosol
Biological process	negative regulation of glucocorticoid receptor signaling pathway; positive regulation of inflammatory response; regulation of transcription, DNA-templated; photoperiodism; regulation of insulin secretion; rhythmic process; regulation of transcription by RNA polymerase II; DNA damage checkpoint signaling; regulation of type B pancreatic cell development; transcription by RNA polymerase II; circadian regulation of gene expression; transcription, DNA-templated; positive regulation of transcription, DNA-templated; response to redox state; cellular response to DNA damage stimulus; positive regulation of NF-kappaB transcription factor activity; circadian rhythm; spermatogenesis; regulation of hair cycle; cellular response to ionizing radiation; negative regulation of transcription, DNA-templated; signal transduction; positive regulation of transcription by RNA polymerase II; proteasome-mediated ubiquitin-dependent protein catabolic process; histone acetylation; protein acetylation; regulation of circadian rhythm
Sources:Amigo / QuickGO
Orthologs
Databases	NCBI: entry; OMA: entry
Species	Human	Mouse
Entrez	9575	12753
Ensembl	ENSG00000134852	ENSMUSG00000029238
UniProt	O15516	O08785
RefSeq (mRNA)	NM_001267843; NM_004898	NM_007715; NM_001289826; NM_001305222
RefSeq (protein)	NP_001254772; NP_004889	NP_001276755; NP_001292151; NP_031741
Location (UCSC)	Chr 4: 55.43 – 55.55 Mb	Chr 5: 76.36 – 76.45 Mb
PubMed search
- Wikidata
View/Edit Human	View/Edit Mouse

CLOCK (backronym for circadian locomotor output cycles kaput) is a gene encoding a basic helix-loop-helix-PAS transcription factor that is known to affect both the persistence and period of circadian rhythms.

Research shows that the CLOCK gene plays a major role as an activator of downstream elements in the pathway critical to the generation of circadian rhythms.

== Discovery ==
The CLOCK gene was first identified in 1997 by Joseph Takahashi and his colleagues. Takahashi used forward mutagenesis screening of mice treated with N-ethyl-N-nitrosourea to create and identify mutations in key genes that broadly affect circadian activity. The CLOCK mutants discovered through the screen displayed an abnormally long period of daily activity. This trait proved to be heritable. Mice bred to be heterozygous showed longer periods of 24.4 hours compared to the control 23.3 hour period. Mice homozygous for the mutation showed 27.3 hour periods, but eventually lost all circadian rhythmicity after several days in constant darkness. That showed that "intact CLOCK genes" are necessary for normal mammalian circadian function, as these mutations were semidominant.

== Function ==
CLOCK protein has been found to play a central role as a transcription factor in the circadian pacemaker. In Drosophila, newly synthesized CLOCK (CLK) is hypophosphorylated in the cytoplasm before entering the nucleus. Once in the nuclei, CLK is localized in nuclear foci and is later redistributed homogeneously. CYCLE (CYC) (also known as dBMAL for the BMAL1 ortholog in mammals) dimerizes with CLK via their respective PAS domains. This dimer then recruits co-activator CREB-binding protein (CBP) and is further phosphorylated. Once phosphorylated, this CLK-CYC complex binds to the E-box elements of the promoters of period (per) and timeless (tim) via its bHLH domain, causing the stimulation of gene expression of per and tim. A large molar excess of period (PER) and timeless (TIM) proteins causes formation of the PER-TIM heterodimer which prevents the CLK-CYC heterodimer from binding to the E-boxes of per and tim, essentially blocking per and tim transcription. CLK is hyperphosphorylated when doubletime (DBT) kinase interacts with the CLK-CYC complex in a PER reliant manner, destabilizing both CLK and PER, leading to the degradation of both proteins. Hypophosphorylated CLK then accumulates, binds to the E-boxes of per and tim and activates their transcription once again. This cycle of post-translational phosphorylation suggest that temporal phosphorylation of CLK helps in the timing mechanism of the circadian clock.

A similar model is found in mice, in which BMAL1 dimerizes with CLOCK to activate per and cryptochrome (cry) transcription. PER and CRY proteins form a heterodimer which acts on the CLOCK-BMAL heterodimer to repress the transcription of per and cry. The heterodimer CLOCK:BMAL1 functions similarly to other transcriptional activator complexes; CLOCK:BMAL1 interacts with the E-box regulatory elements. PER and CRY proteins accumulate and dimerize during subjective night, and translocate into the nucleus to interact with the CLOCK:BMAL1 complex, directly inhibiting their own expression. This research has been conducted and validated through crystallographic analysis.

CLOCK exhibits histone acetyl transferase (HAT) activity, which is enhanced by dimerization with BMAL1. Dr. Paolo Sassone-Corsi and colleagues demonstrated in vitro that CLOCK mediated HAT activity is necessary to rescue circadian rhythms in Clock mutants.

=== Role in other feedback loops ===
The CLOCK-BMAL dimer is involved in regulation of other genes and feedback loops. An enzyme SIRT1 also binds to the CLOCK-BMAL complex and acts to suppress its activity, perhaps by deacetylation of Bmal1 and surrounding histones. However, SIRT1's role is still controversial and it may also have a role in deacetylating PER protein, targeting it for degradation.

The CLOCK-BMAL dimer acts as a positive limb of a feedback loop. The binding of CLOCK-BMAL to an E-box promoter element activates transcription of clock genes such as per1, 2, and 3 and tim in mice. It has been shown in mice that CLOCK-BMAL also activates the Nicotinamide phosphoribosyltransferase gene (also called Nampt), part of a separate feedback loop. This feedback loop creates a metabolic oscillator. The CLOCK-BMAL dimer activates transcription of the Nampt gene, which codes for the NAMPT protein. NAMPT is part of a series of enzymatic reactions that covert niacin (also called nicotinamide) to NAD. SIRT1, which requires NAD for its enzymatic activity, then uses increased NAD levels to suppress BMAL1 through deacetylation. This suppression results in less transcription of the NAMPT, less NAMPT protein, less NAD made, and therefore less SIRT1 and less suppression of the CLOCK-BMAL dimer. This dimer can again positively activate the Nampt gene transcription and the cycle continues, creating another oscillatory loop involving CLOCK-BMAL as positive elements. The key role that Clock plays in metabolic and circadian loops highlights the close relationship between metabolism and circadian clocks.

== Evolution ==
=== Phylogeny ===
The first circadian rhythms were most likely generated by light-driven cell division cycles in ancestral prokaryotic species. This proto-rhythm later evolved into a self-sustaining clock via gene duplication and functional divergence of clock genes. The kaiA/B/C gene clusters remain the oldest of the clock genes as they are present in cyanobacteria, with kaiC most likely the ancestor of kaiA and kaiB. The function of these ancestral clock genes was most likely related to chromosome function before evolving a timing mechanism. The kaiA and kaiB genes arose after cyanobacteria separated from other prokaryotes. Harsh climate conditions in the early history of the Earth's formation, such as UV irradiation, may have led to the diversification of clock genes in prokaryotes in response to drastic changes in climate.

Cryptochromes, light-sensitive proteins regulated by Cry genes, are most likely descendents of kaiC resulting from a genome duplication predating the Cambrian explosion and are responsible for negative regulation of circadian clocks. Other distinct clock gene lineages arose early in vertebrate evolution, with gene BMAL1 paralogous to CLOCK. Their common ancestor, however, most likely predated the insect-vertebrate split roughly 500 mya. WC1, an analog of CLOCK/BMAL1 found in fungal genomes, is a proposed candidate common ancestor predating the fungi-animal split. A BLAST search conducted in a 2004 review of clock gene evolution suggested the Clock gene may have arisen from a duplication in the BMAL1 gene, though this hypothesis remains speculative. Another theory alternatively proposes the NPAS2 gene as the paralog of CLOCK that performs a similar role in the circadian rhythm pathway but in different tissues.

=== Variant allele forms ===
Allelic variations within the Clock1a gene in particular are hypothesized to have effects on seasonal timing according to a 2014 study conducted in a population of cyprinid fishes. Polymorphisms in the gene mainly affect the length of the PolyQ domain region, providing an example of divergent evolution where species sharing an ecological niche will partition resources in seasonally variable environments. The length of the PolyQ domain is associated with changes in transcription level of CLOCK. On average, longer allele lengths were correlated with recently derived species and earlier-spawning species, most likely due to seasonal changes in water temperature. The researchers hypothesize that the length of the domain may serve to compensate for changes in temperature by altering the rate of CLOCK transcription. All other amino acids remained identical across native species, indicating that functional constraint may be another factor influencing CLOCK gene evolution in addition to gene duplication and diversification.

=== Role in mammalian evolution ===
One 2017 study investigating the role of CLOCK expression in neurons determined its function in regulating transcriptional networks that could provide insight into human brain evolution. The researchers synthesized differentiated human neurons in vitro and then performed gene knockdown to test the effect of CLOCK on neuronal cell signaling. When CLOCK activity was disrupted, increased neuronal migration of tissue in the neocortex was observed, suggesting a molecular mechanism for cortical expansion unique to human brain development. However, the precise role of CLOCK in metabolic regulation of cortical neurons remains to be determined. Another study looking at the relationship between CLOCK polymorphisms in the 3' flanking region and morning/evening preference in adults found a correlation between subjects with the 3111C allele and preference for evening hours based on answers provided in a scored questionnaire. This region is well conserved between mice and humans and polymorphisms have been shown to affect mRNA stability, indicating allelic variants could disrupt normal circadian patterns in mammals leading to conditions such as insomnia or other sleep disorders.

== Mutants ==
Clock mutant organisms can either possess a null mutation or an antimorphic allele at the Clock locus that codes for an antagonist to the wild-type protein. The presence of an antimorphic protein downregulates the transcriptional products normally upregulated by Clock.

=== Drosophila ===
In Drosophila, a mutant form of Clock (Jrk) was identified by Allada, Hall, and Rosbash in 1998. The team used forward genetics to identify non-circadian rhythms in mutant flies. Jrk results from a premature stop codon that eliminates the activation domain of the CLOCK protein. This mutation causes dominant effects: half of the heterozygous flies with this mutant gene have a lengthened period of 24.8 hours, while the other half become arrhythmic. Homozygous flies lose their circadian rhythm. Furthermore, the same researchers demonstrated that these mutant flies express low levels of PER and TIM proteins, indicating that Clock functions as a positive element in the circadian loop. While the mutation affects the circadian clock of the fly, it does not cause any physiological or behavioral defects. The similar sequence between Jrk and its mouse homolog suggests common circadian rhythm components were present in both Drosophila and mice ancestors. A recessive allele of Clock leads to behavioral arrhythmicity while maintaining detectable molecular and transcriptional oscillations. This suggests that Clk contributes to the amplitude of circadian rhythms.

=== Mice ===
The mouse homolog to the Jrk mutant is the ClockΔ19 mutant that possesses a deletion in exon 19 of the Clock gene. This dominant-negative mutation results in a defective CLOCK-BMAL dimer, which causes mice to have a decreased ability to activate per transcription. In constant darkness, ClockΔ19 mice heterozygous for the Clock mutant allele exhibit lengthened circadian periods, while ClockΔ19/Δ19 mice homozygous for the allele become arrhythmic. In both heterozygotes and homozygotes, this mutation also produces lengthened periods and arrhythmicity at the single-cell level.

Clock -/- null mutant mice, in which Clock has been knocked out, display completely normal circadian rhythms. The discovery of a null Clock mutant with a wild-type phenotype directly challenged the widely accepted premise that Clock is necessary for normal circadian function. Furthermore, it suggested that the CLOCK-BMAL1 dimer need not exist to modulate other elements of the circadian pathway. Neuronal PAS domain containing protein 2 (NPAS2, a CLOCK paralog) can substitute for CLOCK in these Clock-null mice. Mice with one NPAS2 allele showed shorter periods at first, but eventual arrhythmic behavior.

== Observed effects ==
In humans, a polymorphism in Clock, rs6832769, may be related to the personality trait agreeableness. Another single nucleotide polymorphism (SNP) in Clock, 3111C, associated with diurnal preference, is also associated with increased insomnia, difficulty losing weight, and recurrence of major depressive episodes in patients with bipolar disorder.

In mice, Clock has been implicated in sleep disorders, metabolism, pregnancy, and mood disorders. Clock mutant mice sleep less than normal mice each day. The mice also display altered levels of plasma glucose and rhythms in food intake. These mutants develop metabolic syndrome symptoms over time. Furthermore, Clock mutants demonstrate disrupted estrous cycles and increased rates of full-term pregnancy failure. Mutant Clock has also been linked to bipolar disorder-like symptoms in mice, including mania and euphoria. Clock mutant mice also exhibit increased excitability of dopamine neurons in reward centers of the brain. These results have led Colleen McClung to propose using Clock mutant mice as a model for human mood and behavior disorders.

The CLOCK-BMAL dimer has also been shown to activate reverse-erb receptor alpha (Rev-ErbA alpha) and retinoic acid orphan receptor alpha (ROR-alpha). REV-ERBα and RORα regulate Bmal by binding to retinoic acid-related orphan receptor response elements (ROREs) in its promoter.

Variations in the epigenetics of the Clock gene may lead to an increased risk of breast cancer. It was found that in women with breast cancer, there was significantly less methylation of the Clock promoter region. It was also noted that this effect was greater in women with estrogen and progesterone receptor-negative tumors.

The CLOCK gene may also be a target for somatic mutations in microsatellite unstable colorectal cancers. In one study, 53% of microsatellite instability colorectal cancer cases contained somatic CLOCK mutations. Nascent research in the expression of circadian genes in adipose tissue suggests that suppression of the CLOCK gene may causally correlate not only with obesity, but also with type 2 diabetes, with quantitative physical responses to circadian food intake as potential inputs to the clock system.

== See also ==
- BMAL1 gene
- Cycle gene
- Familial sleep traits
- PDF (gene)
- Period gene
- Pigment dispersing factor (pdf)
- Suprachiasmatic nucleus
- Timeless gene
