= Familial sleep traits =

Heritable variations in sleep patterns

Familial sleep traits are heritable variations in sleep patterns, resulting in abnormal sleep-wake times and/or abnormal sleep length.

Circadian rhythms are coordinated physiological and biological changes that oscillate on an approximately 24-hour cycle. Disruptions to these rhythms in humans may affect the duration, onset, and/or quality of sleep during this cycle, resulting in familial sleep traits. These traits are not necessarily syndromes because they do not always cause distress among individuals. Instead of being disorders, familial sleep traits are variations in an individual's biological tendencies of sleep-wake times, and are only considered syndromes if affected individuals complain about life interference, in which case they may fall under the category of Circadian Rhythm Sleep Disorders (CRSD) that affect sleep timing and circadian rhythms. Some of these circadian disorders include Advanced Sleep Phase Disorder (ASPD) and Delayed Sleep Phase Disorder (DSPD). Familial sleep traits are more specific than CRSD because they are heritable and involve a wide range of Mendelian genes. Evidence has shown that genes significantly influence sleep schedules in mammals, including humans, and account for one-third of the variation in sleep quality and duration. Studies in human monozygotic twins have provided evidence that genetic factors affect "normal" sleep patterns as well, meaning ones where no individual has been diagnosed with an altered phenotypic sleep trait.

Sleep timing is controlled by the circadian clock, which can entrain to environmental stimuli (usually a light-dark cycle) and is regulated by a transcription-translation feedback loop (TTFL). In humans, there are multiple genes involved in this molecular biological clock, which when mutated may result in sleep disorders such as Familial Advanced Sleep Phase (FASP), Familial Delayed Sleep Phase (FDSP), and Familial Natural Short Sleep (FNSS). Some mutations in Mendelian genes that are involved in the TTFL have been identified as the causes of these sleep traits, including PER2, PER3, CRY2, CRY1. Other Mendelian genes that are not known to play a core role in the TTFL but are involved in FNSS include DEC2 and ADRB1.

With some familial sleep traits, there may be a shift in an individual's chronotype, which describes the time of sleep-wake behaviors that result from circadian rhythms. Chronotype may shift depending on multiple factors including gender and age. Individuals with FASP have earlier chronotypes and individuals with FDSP have later chronotypes compared to a conventional sleep period which runs from approximately 10pm to 7am. Individuals may meet the criteria for FASP or FDSP if they have Advanced Sleep Phase or Delayed Sleep Phase and at least one first degree relative with the trait. Researchers have examined the human prevalence of FASP to be 0.33-0.5% by including individuals who have a sleep onset at approximately 8:30pm and offset at 5:30am. FDSP, which includes individuals who have a delayed sleep onset and offset, has an unknown human prevalence and may vary based on location, definition, and age.

== History of discoveries ==
Familial sleep traits have been difficult to study due to the various environmental influences (such as entraining daily alarms, artificial light at night, and caffeine or stimulant intake) that can contribute to different behavioral phenotypes in humans. Despite these potential difficulties, Louis Ptáček and colleagues discovered evidence of a human familial circadian rhythm variant in the 1990s. This variant resulted in a shorter period and an advance of melatonin and temperature rhythms and was initially termed Advanced Sleep Phase Syndrome (ASPS) in a 1999 publication. Individuals with ASPS have earlier sleep and wake onsets, meaning they both go to bed and wake up earlier compared to control groups. The first participant with this phenotype told researchers she recognized similar sleep patterns in her family. From structured interviews and family pedigree analysis, some of these individuals were identified to have ASPS as well, providing evidence that this phenotype could be genetic, resulting in Familial Advanced Sleep Phase (FASP). In this 1999 publication, researchers were also able to conclude that this trait has an autosomal dominant mode of inheritance with high penetrance. This means that the genes involved in FASP are passed through non-sex chromosomes, and an individual only needs one copy of the gene across homologs for the gene to be expressed. Since this initial 1999 FASP publication, other circadian biologists including Phyllis Zee and Joseph Takahashi have conducted further genetic analysis. They published a paper in 2001 that presented data showing a phenotypically characterized case of Advanced Sleep Phase Syndrome to provide further evidence that this trait can be hereditary. Since these studies, Csnk1d, PER2, PER3, and CRY2 have all been identified as important in hereditary FASP.

Another sleep trait, Delayed Sleep Phase Syndrome (DSPS) was first identified by Elliot Weitzman and colleagues in 1981. Individuals with DSPS typically cannot fall asleep until later and wake up later compared to control groups. They often cannot fall asleep until between 2:00-6:00am, but then have a normal sleep duration. However, DSPS was not hypothesized to have a genetic component until researchers at University of California, San Diego discovered a familial pedigree with DSPS in 2001, adding this Familial Delayed Sleep Phase (FDSP) to the list of heritable sleep traits. Almost two decades later in 2017, Michael Young and colleagues in New York published findings that further supported delayed sleep to have a genetic component, resulting in FDSP. These scientists reported that a mutation in CRY1, a component of the TTFL that represses Clock and Bmal1, results in a gain-of-function variation that lengthens circadian period.

In addition to these findings, Familial Natural Short Sleep (FNSS) is another heritable sleep trait that has been studied over the past few years. In 2009, Ying-Hui Fu and Ptáček discovered the first short-sleep gene by identifying a mutation in the DEC2 gene that resulted in an average of 6.25 hours of sleep a night instead of 8.06 hours, an identifying feature of FNSS. This was the first genetic discovery for this sleep trait, broadening the scope of familial sleep trait research. In 2019, Ptáček and Fu published further research about the genetic aspect of FNSS, identifying a mutation in the gene ADRB1 that increases the activity of ADRB1+ neurons in the dorsal pons.

Most of the research conducted thus far has been surrounding FASP, FDSP, and FNSS, with recent studies beginning to examine the roles of heritable sleep variability on autism-spectrum disorder (ASD) and Alzheimer's disease (AD). ASD, a neurodevelopmental disorder, has evidence of genetic components and affected individuals have reported a high prevalence of insomnia. Fu, Ptáček, and colleagues have hypothesized that it may be interesting to examine if sleep traits and disruptions can exacerbate the atypical neurodevelopment in ASD. Additionally, recent research about AD, a neurodegenerative disease, has suggested that sleep disruption might contribute to the disease. A characteristic factor of AD is the accumulation of $A\beta$ plaques. These plaques are usually at a lower level in the brain interstitial space when an individual first wakes up and then during waking hours these levels increase. Sleep disruption can eliminate the reduction in $A\beta$ levels, which is important during disease progression. Both ASD and AD demonstrate how the heritability of sleep traits may also be involved in disorders and diseases that are not traditionally thought of as circadian, but more research must be done in this field.

== Heritable sleep traits ==
The functions of heritability for many sleep traits are not well known, underscoring the importance of continued research into the human genome.

=== Familial Advanced Sleep Phase ===
Familial Advanced Sleep Phase (FASP) results in an individual having a circadian clock that is entrained to their surroundings, but gives the impression that the individual is not. This trait typically develops during middle age, and is more common in older adults. Affected individuals typically have a free-running period of about 22 hours, shorter than the average person who has a free-running period closer to 24 hours. This also means that certain physiological markers, such as body temperature and melatonin will be present at higher levels earlier in the day as compared to an average person.

==== Symptoms ====
FASP is typically characterized by excessively early sleep and wake times. Additionally, individuals may experience excessive daytime sleepiness if they are forced to adhere to a schedule offset from their personal biological clock. Individuals with FASP are typically phase advanced by 4 to 6 hours as compared to the average person.

==== Treatments ====
FASP is traditionally treated with light therapy in the evenings, or behaviorally with chronotherapy. Individuals with FASP typically need to have a two-hour delay per day to remain entrained, due to their 22-hour period. Pharmacological interventions are typically avoided due to risks associated with daytime drug-induced sleepiness.

==== Molecular Basis ====
FASP has been mapped to chromosome 2q. Genes that are known to influence the presentation of FASP are CRY2, PER2, PER3 and CK1∂. TIMELESS (hTIM) has also been shown to cause FASP. These mutations are critical in the trait's phenotype and heritability. This trait is inherited in an autosomal dominant fashion.

=== Familial Delayed Sleep Phase ===
Familial Delayed Sleep Phase (FDSP) results in an individual having a circadian clock that is entrained to their surroundings, but gives the impression that the individual is not. The trait typically develops in adolescence. Affected individuals have a free-running period that is longer than the average 24 hours, meaning that certain physiological markers, such as body temperature and melatonin, are present in higher levels later in the day as compared to the average person.

==== Symptoms ====
FDSP is typically characterized by excessively late sleep times and wake times, and may include daytime sleepiness if the individual is forced to adhere to a schedule offset from their personal biological clock. Individuals with FDSP may have comorbidities with depression, Attention Deficit Hyperactivity Disorder (ADHD), obesity, and Obsessive-Compulsive Disorder (OCD).

==== Treatments ====
Treatment is usually non-pharmacological, with light therapy being a common intervention. Phase delay chronotherapy is also occasionally used. Melatonin taken at night will not change the individual's circadian rhythm, but may act as a temporary solution.

==== Molecular Basis ====
FDSP is heritable and linked to mutations in the PER3 and CRY1 genes, which result in the delayed sleep phenotype.

=== Fatal Familial Insomnia ===
Fatal Familial Insomnia (FFI) is a disorder that results in trouble sleeping, speech and coordination problems, and eventually dementia. Most of those affected die within a few years, and the disorder has no cure. The disorder can manifest any time from age 18 to 60, but the average age of affected individuals is 50 years old.

==== Symptoms ====
The disorder has a 4-stage progression, starting with individuals experiencing insomnia, progressing to seeing hallucinations, then inability to sleep and dramatic weight loss, and finally dementia, which is followed by death. Individuals have a 6-36 month prognosis after they begin experiencing symptoms.

==== Treatments ====
Due to the prognosis of the disorder, treatment is often minimal and palliative in nature. Sleeping pills and other traditional treatments are not found to be beneficial in treating FFI.

==== Molecular Basis ====
The disorder is caused by a mutation of the PRNP gene resulting in the creation of a prion. These prions result in neurodegeneration, leading to FFI. This mutation can either occur spontaneously or be passed down in an autosomal dominant manner.

=== Familial Natural Short Sleep ===
Familial natural short sleep (FNSS) is a distinct category of habitual short sleep. Individuals with this trait usually get 4–6.5 hours of sleep per day but do not have daytime sleepiness and do not need catch-up sleep on the weekends. After sleep deprivation, these individuals have less of a sleep deficit than individuals without FNSS. Additionally, affected individuals have a higher behavioral drive, resulting in many holding high pressure jobs, and they may have a better ability to deal with stress. People with FNSS are commonly mistaken for having insomnia. The prevalence of FNSS is currently unknown, however mutations in the genes DEC2 and ADRB1, NPSR1, and GRM1 have been linked to FNSS.

==== Symptoms ====
FNSS is unique because individuals with this sleep trait show no symptoms of shorter sleep. They are able to be active and function normally.

==== Treatments ====
FNSS may be seen as advantageous rather than detrimental to some individuals. Therefore, because FNSS does not negatively impact most affected individuals, treatment options for it have not been well researched or documented.

==== Health effects ====
Such mutations appear to reduce Alzheimer's pathology in mice.

==== Molecular Basis ====
In 2009, Ying-Hui Fu and colleagues described how a genetic variant in DEC2 produced the short sleep phenotype. In this variant, an arginine residue is substituted for a proline residue typically present at position 384. Within the family studied, people having the DEC2 mutation had shorter sleep durations. The researchers found the same phenotype when mutating this gene in Drosophila and mice. Interestingly, they found that the mutant mice did not display changes in their free-running activity period. DEC2 functions as a transcriptional repressor and increases expression of hypocretin, which promotes a waked state. DEC2 inhibits CLOCK/BMAL1 activation of PER, through protein-protein interaction or competition for the E-box transcriptional elements. A separate study using dizygotic twins with a novel DEC2 mutation showed that one twin had shorter sleep duration. These results demonstrate that DEC2 is able to affect sleep length through weakened transcriptional repression.

Another important gene involved in FNSS is ADRB1. ADRB1 neurons in mice are active they are awake and are found in the dorsal pons. Through additional family studies, mutations in ADRB1 have shown the reduced sleep phenotype.

In a more recent study done by Lijuan Xing and colleagues, NPSR1 was linked to FNSS. In this study, researchers identified a family with a mutation in the NPSR1 gene, which caused a short sleep phenotype. NPSR1 is a G-protein coupled receptor that plays a role in arousal and sleep behaviors. This NPSR1 mutation was recreated in mice, and the researchers found the same short sleep phenotype present.

In another study done by Guangsen Shi and colleagues, GRM1 was linked to FNSS. Here, researchers identified two GRM1 mutations in two different FNSS families. They recreated these same mutations in mouse models and found that they caused the mice to sleep less. Similarly in 2025 Hongmin Chen and collagues including Guangsen Shi and others from the previous study identified a mutation in salt-induced kinase 3 (hSIK3-N783Y) associated with the natural short sleep trait and showed that mouse model carrying the homologous mutation presented reduced sleep duration

Understanding how these individuals are able to tolerate higher sleep pressure and behavioral drive will prove useful for numerous people that hold jobs which require long durations of wakefulness.

=== Familial Natural Long Sleep ===
Familial natural long sleep (FNLS) likely exists, however there have not been any genetic variants found that cause FNLS. People with FNLS likely need more than 8 hours of sleep per day to feel well rested. This group of individuals may be harder to detect due to comorbidities, such as depression. Additional research is necessary to learn more about this sleep trait.

== See also ==
- Chronobiology
- Irregular sleep-wake rhythm
- Non-24-hour sleep-wake disorder
- Shift work sleep disorder
- Jet lag
- Sleep epigenetics
