= Hajime Tei =

Japanese neuroscientist

- Born: March 1959 (age 66–67)
- Known for: Chronobiology
- Scientific career
- Fields: Neurophysiology, general neuroscience, circadian rhythms, suprachiasmatic nucleus, clock gene
- Institutions: Kanazawa University Mitsubishi Kagaku Institute of Life Sciences University of Tokyo

Hajime Tei (程 肇, テイ ハジメ born March 1959) is a Japanese neuroscientist specializing in the study of chronobiology. He currently serves as a professor at the Kanazawa University Graduate School of Natural Science & Technology. He is most notable for his contributions to the discovery of the mammalian period genes, which he discovered alongside Yoshiyuki Sakaki and Hitoshi Okamura.

== Career ==
Between 1991 and 1992, Tei was a fellow for the Fellowships of the Japan Society for Japanese Junior Scientists at the University of Tokyo's Institute of Medical Science. He later held the position of assistant professor (1992-2001) and associate professor (2001-2004). During his time as an assistant professor, Tei worked alongside Yoshiyuki Sakaki and Hitoshi Okamura to discover the mammalian period genes Per1, Per2, and Per3. They also discovered the mammalian homolog of the Drosophila gene Timeless. In 2004, Tei became the principal investigator of the Laboratory of Chronogenomics at Mitsubishi Kagaku Institute of Life Sciences. In 2009, he became a full professor at the Kanazawa University Graduate School of Natural Science & Technology, a position he currently serves to-date.

=== Awards ===
Hajime Tei received the 13th Tsukahara Memorial Award in 1999, and the Aschoff-Honma Prize for chronobiology in 2001.

== Scientific contributions ==
=== Chronobiology ===
==== Discovery of mammalian Period genes ====
In 1997, Hajime Tei, Yoshiyuki Sakaki, and Hitoshi Okamura identified the human and mouse Per homologues of the Drosophila Per gene. They discovered that hPer (the human homolog of dPer) and mPer (the mouse homolog of dPer) encoded PAS-domain-containing polypeptides that are highly homologous to dPer. They also found that mPer showed autonomous circadian oscillation in its expression in the suprachiasmatic nucleus (SCN) which acts as the primary circadian pacemaker in the mammalian brain. They were able to discover this by using a method called intra-module scanning-polymerase chain reaction (IMS-PCR), which allowed them to screen out short stretches of DNA sequences and isolate mammalian homologs of the Drosophila Per gene.

==== Identification of mammalian Timeless homolog ====
In 1998, Hajime Tei, in collaboration with other researchers, identified a mammalian homolog of the Drosophila timeless gene. During this research project, timeless was analyzed in the adult mouse SCN, but only weak oscillations were observed.

==== Discovery of circadian clocks in peripheral organs ====
Tei and Shin Yamazaki developed the first rodent model that was used to monitor circadian gene expression rhythms. This was done using a luciferase reporter gene expressed under the Per1. In 2000, using their rodent model, they discovered the existence of circadian clocks in peripheral organs of mammals. This discovery led to the current understanding of mammalian circadian control as a multi-oscillatory system. He was also part of a team that discovered feeding cycles can entrain liver independently of the suprachiasmatic nucleus (SCN) and the light cycle.

==== Calcium flux in mammalian pacemaker neurons ====
In 2005, Tei, G. Lundkvist, Y. Kwak, E. Davis, and G. Block proposed that the molecular clock was linked to neurons' membrane potential via voltage-dependent regulation of Ca^{2+} influx, as well as secondary action of intracellular Ca^{2+} on gene transcription. Additionally, the same study found that removal of Ca^{2+} from the medium, as well as blocking the Ca^{2+} channels, stopped the SCN's circadian clock, while hyperpolarization of a K^{+} medium led to altered rhythms in the SCN.

==== Regulation of bone resorption by circadian clocks ====
In 2016, a research team that included Tei discovered that clock genes, most specifically Bmal1 and Per1, are rhythmically expressed in osteoblasts to modulate the osteoblast-dependent regulation of osteoclastogenesis by regulating 1,25(OH)_{2}D_{3}-induced Rankl expression in osteoblasts. Specifically for Bmal1, they found that Bmal1-deficient osteoblasts promote osteoclastogenesis. These findings could lead to future studies of RAR patterns and bone turnover markers.

=== Timeline of contributions ===
Event	Year
Discovery of mammalian Period genes	1997
Identification of mammalian Timeless homolog	1998
Discovery of circadian clocks in peripheral organs	2000
Study on calcium flux in mammalian pacemaker neurons	2005
Discovery of regulation of bone resorption by circadian clocks	2016

== Applications of scientific contributions ==
Tei holds a patent on a Per1 promoter sequence that, when operably linked to another gene, will rhythmically promote its transcription. This promoter sequence allows for the creation of transgenic animals that will be useful in studying circadian disorders and diseases. Additionally, pharmaceutical treatments for such diseases can be tested on transgenic animals with this specific promoter.

== Collaborators ==
From early in his professional career to his work current projects, Tei has worked with many other chronobiologists. Specifically, he is listed as a recurring co-author with the following scientists:

- Yoshiyuki Sakaki
- Shin Yamazaki
- Gene D. Block
- Rika Numano
- Michael Menaker
