= Sakaki (disambiguation) =

Sakaki or Cleyera japonica is an evergreen tree native to Japan.

Sakaki may also refer to:

== People ==
- Hajime Sakaki (榊 俶; 1856–1897), Japanese physician and the first professor of psychiatry in that country
- Hideo Sakaki (榊 英雄; born 1970), Japanese actor
- Sakaki Hyakusen (彭城 百川; 1697–1752), Japanese painter
- Ichirō Sakaki (榊 一郎; born 1969), Japanese writer
- Judy K. Sakaki (born 1953) American former academic administrator
- Michito Sakaki (榊 道人; born 1983), Australian rules football player
- Nana Sakaki (榊 菜吟; born 2003), Japanese women's professional shogi player
- Nanao Sakaki (ななおさかき; 1923–2008), Japanese poet
- Shota Sakaki (榊 翔太; born 1993), Japanese football player
- Yoneichiro Sakaki (榊 米一郎; 1913-2014), Japanese electrical engineer
- Yoshiyuki Sakaki (榊 佳之; born 1942), Japanese molecular biologist

== Characters ==
- Sakaki (Azumanga Daioh), a character from the manga and anime series Azumanga Daioh
- Sakaki, a character in the .hack//G.U. franchise
- Deidoro Sakaki, a character from the My Hero Academia
- Giovanni (Pokémon), known as Sakaki in Japan, a character from the Pokémon series
- Seitaroh Sakaki, a character from the Patlabor
- Takaya Sakaki, a character from the Persona 3
- Yuko Sakaki, a character from Battle Royale
- Yuya Sakaki, a fictional character from the Yu-Gi-Oh! Arc-V

== Places ==
- Sakaki, Nagano, a town located in Hanishina District, Nagano, Japan
- Sakaki Station, a railway station on the Shinano Railway Line

== Others ==
- Sakaki, two destroyers of Japan
