= Louis Ptáček =

American neurologist and professor

Louis Ptáček is an American neurologist and professor of Czech origin. He contributed to the field of genetics and neuroscience. He was also an HHMI investigator from 1997 to 2018. His chief areas of research include the understanding of inherited Mendelian disorders and circadian rhythm genes. Currently, Ptáček is a neurology professor and a director of the Division of Neurogenetics in University of California, San Francisco, School of Medicine. His current investigations primarily focus on extensive clinical studies in families with hereditary disorders, which include identifying and characterizing the genes responsible for neurological variations.

== Background and education ==
In 1982, Louis Ptáček earned his Bachelor of Science degree in mathematics from the University of Wisconsin-Madison. In 1986, he received his Doctor of Medicine degree from the University of Wisconsin-Madison Medical School. During his neurology residency at University of Utah, he met a 28-year-old female patient who was suffering from sporadic paralysis, that inspired his current interest in the research of genetic diseases and episodic disorders. In 1991, he discovered that a mutation in a gene (SCN4A) that coded for a muscle cell sodium channel caused the patient's condition, hyperkalemic periodic paralysis. As the first channel was discovered to cause human disease, this human skeletal muscle sodium channel prevented the muscle from proper contractions. This invoked a series of discoveries of mutant ion channel genes that constructed the framework for studying similar diseases, which Ptáček calls "channelopathies."

In 1999, Christopher Jones, a neurologist from University of Utah who specializes in sleep disorders, contacted Ptáček to characterize a family of early risers and find the genes associated with this phenotype. He and his partner, Ying-Hui Fu, in collaboration with Jones, have identified multiple genes, such as hPer2, that are responsible for familial advanced sleep phase syndrome (FASPS). This discovery prompted Ptáček to continue his research on circadian genes.

=== Episodic diseases ===
==== Channelopathies ====
Ptáček began his research on episodic neurological diseases by cloning and identifying genes that were responsible for periodic paralysis and non-dystrophic myotonia. His research focuses on determining episodic disorders of the muscle, heart, and brain, and found that many episodic diseases result from mutations in the electrical signaling of cell membranes. He had a large role in discovering that hyperkalemic periodic paralysis, paramyotonia congenita, Andersen-Tawil syndrome, and thyrotoxic periodic paralysis are caused by mutations in genes encoding for voltage gated ion channels.

==== Andersen-Tawil syndrome (ATS) ====
His current research mainly focuses on identifying the genes involved with Andersen-Tawil syndrome (ATS). Ptáček's lab have identified KCNJ2 mutations to be potentially responsible for this syndrome, but due to the intrafamilial variability among the mutations, they hope to identify and characterize this gene further. Thus far, Ptáček and his colleagues have identified six disease-causing mutations, five of which are dominant negative mutations that mask the wild-type allele, resulting in a loss-of-function of that gene. With his continued research on ATS, Ptáček has discovered and identified additional phenotypic diagnostic criteria for ATS using skeletal and dental findings. Additionally, he has identified other markers of the KCNJ2 channel mutation's including its ECG outputs' T-Wave and U-Wave patterns in order to provide more accurate differential diagnosis from Long QT Syndrome.

==== Thyrotoxic periodic paralysis (TPP) ====
Ptáček, with a team of collaborators, hypothesized that thyrotoxic periodic paralysis may be a case of channelopathy and can arise from ion channel mutations that display symptoms with hyperthyroidism. In January 2010, they discovered a gene that encodes Kir2.6, a novel inwardly rectifying potassium channel. This protein channel, highly similar to Kir2.2, is transcriptionally regulated by the thyroid hormone and expressed in skeletal muscles. Kir2.6 mutations, found in one third of unrelated TPP patients in the initial study, affect muscle membrane excitability and can lead to periodic paralysis.

=== Human sleep behavior ===
==== Familial advanced sleep phase syndrome (FASPS) ====
In 1999, Ptáček was introduced to a family in Utah who had a very distinct sleep schedule. After analyzing the family's pedigree and identifying individuals with a genetic basis for an advanced sleep phase, he coined the term familial advanced sleep phase syndrome (FASPS). The disorder is characterized by around a four-hour phase advance, causing individuals to sleep from approximately 7:30 pm to 4:30 am.

In 2001, Ptáček and his colleagues discovered the mutation in the autosomal dominant allele responsible for FASPS. The point mutation is in the hPer2 gene, and results in a serine to glycine amino acid substitution at position 662. Specially, this mutation occurs in the CK1ε binding region of the PER2 protein, and causes PER2 to be hypophosphorylated in that region, allowing it to be more stable and enter the nucleus faster. This results in quicker suppression of the hPer2 gene transcription, shortening the individual's circadian period and leading to FASPS symptoms.

Ptáček and his colleagues have also found that hPer2 is not the only gene that causes FASPS when mutated, and current research is exploring other sporadic cases of FASPS to identify new mutations that contribute to the syndrome.

==== Ongoing research ====
Currently, Ptáček's lab is interested in studying the genetic basis of familial delayed sleep phase syndrome (FSDPS), which is a condition characterized by a delay in the sleep cycle where affected individuals fall asleep late in the night and wake up late in the morning or afternoon. Thus far, little is known about FDSPS although it is thought to be a heritable condition relatively common in adolescents with symptoms typically subsiding with age. However, some individuals are affected by FSDPS throughout their lives.

== Awards and honors ==
| American Neurological Association | 1992 | Presidents Award |
| University of Utah | 1996 | Golden Anniversary Prize for Distinguished Clinical Investigation |
| American Neurological Association | 1997 | Derek Denny-Brown Neurological Scholar Award |
| Brandies University | 2006 | Bauer Foundation Distinguished Professor |
| National Academy of Medicine | 2007 | Elected Member |
| American Academy of Arts and Sciences | 2008 | Elected Member |
| Association of American Physicians | 2012 | Elected Member |
| National Academy of Sciences | 2012 | Elected Member |
| University of California, San Francisco | 2012 | Faculty Lecture Award in Basic Science (the highest award UCSF bestows upon its faculty) |
| The American Society for Clinical Investigation | 2015 | Stanley J. Korsmeyer Award |
| American Association for the Advancement of Science | 2016 | Elected Fellow |
| Sleep Research Society | 2019 | Distinguished Scientist Award |

== Selected publications ==
1. Toh KL, Jones CR, He Y, Eide EJ, Hinz WA, Virshup DM, Ptáček LJ, Fu Y-H. An hPer2 Phosphorylation Site Mutation in Familial Advanced Sleep-Phase Syndrome. Science. 2001;291:1040-1043.
2. Plaster, NM, Tawil R, Tristani-Firouze M, Canun S, Bendahhou S, Tsunoda A, Donaldson MR, Iannaccone ST, Brunt E, Barohn R, Clark J, Deymeer F, George AL, Fish FA, Hahn A, Nitu A, Ozdemir C, Serdaroglu P, Subramony S, Wolfe G, Fu Y-H, Ptáček LJ. Mutations in Kir2.1 cause the developmental and episodic electrical phenotypes of Andersen’s Syndrome. Cell. 2001, 105:511-519.
3. Xu Y, Padiath Q, Shapiro R, Jones CR, Wu SC, Saigoh N, Saigoh K, Ptáček LJ, Fu Y-H. Functional consequences of a CK1δ mutation causing familial advanced sleep phase syndrome. Nature. 2005: Vol. 434:640-644.
4. Jones CR, Campbell SS, Zone SE, Cooper F, DeSano A, Murphy PJ, Jones B, Czajkowski L, Ptáček LJ. Familial advanced sleep-phase syndrome: a short period circadian rhythm variant in humans. Nat Med. 1999;5:1062-1065.
5. Padiath QS, Saigoh K, Schiffmann R, Asahara H, Koeppen A, Hogan K, Ptáček LJ, Fu YH. Lamin B1 duplications cause autosomal dominant leukodystrophy. Nat Genet. 2006 Oct; 38(10):1114-23.
6. Xu Y, Toh KL, Jones CR, Shin JY, Fu YH, Ptáček LJ. Modeling of a human circadian mutation yields insights into clock regulation by PER2. Cell. 2007 Jan 12; 128(1):59-70.
