= Yoneichiro Sakaki =

Japanese electrical engineer

Yoneichiro Sakaki (榊 米一郎, Sakaki Yoneichirō) is a Japanese electrical engineer. From 1976 to 1984, he served as the first president of the Toyohashi University of Technology.

His son Yoshiyuki Sakaki currently serves as the sixth president of TUT.
