= Nagaoka University of Technology =

National university in Nagaoka, Niigata, Japan

Coordinates: 37°25′30.94″N 138°46′41.44″E

- 長岡技術科学大学
- Motto: Vitality, Originality and Services
- Type: Public (National)
- Established: 1976
- President: Azuma Nobuhiko
- Academic staff: 215
- Administrative staff: 106
- Undergraduates: 1286
- Postgraduates: 1075
- Doctoral students: 178
- Other students: 30
- Location: Nagaoka, Niigata prefecture, Japan
- Campus: Urban
- Mascot: None
- Website: www.nagaokaut.ac.jp

Nagaoka University of Technology (長岡技術科学大学, Nagaoka Gijutsu Kagaku Daigaku), abbreviated as Nagaoka Gidai, is a national technological university in Nagaoka, Niigata, Japan. It is one of two universities of technology in Japan, the other being Toyohashi University of Technology in Aichi.

The university requires fourth year students to spend up to five months on-the-job experience (internship) in private enterprises, government agencies, and elsewhere.

== Organization ==
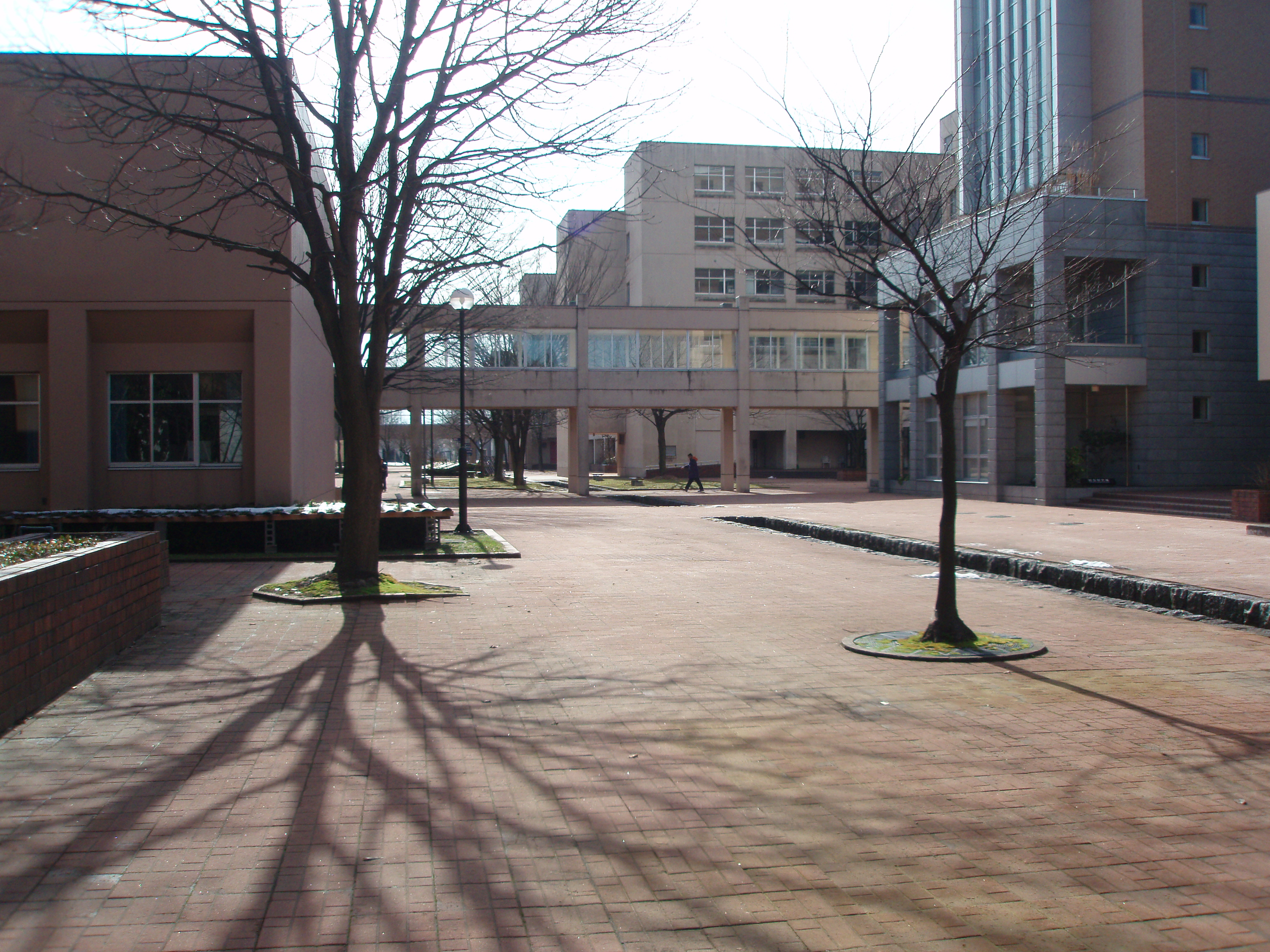
Nagaoka University of Technology

=== Faculty ===
- School of Engineering
  - Mechanical Engineering
  - Electrical, Electronics and Information Engineering
  - Materials Science and Technology
  - Civil Engineering
  - Environmental Systems Engineering
  - Bioengineering
  - Management and Information Systems Engineering

=== Graduate School of Engineering ===
- Master's Program
  - Mechanical Engineering
  - Electrical, Electronics and Information Engineering
  - Material Science & Technology
  - Civil Engineering
  - Environmental System Engineering
  - Bio-engineering
  - Management and Information Systems Engineering
  - Nuclear System Safety Engineering
- Doctoral Program
  - Information Science and Control Engineering
  - Materials Science
  - Energy and Environment Science
  - Integrated Bio-science and Technology
- 5-years Doctoral Program
  - Science of Technology Innovation

=== Graduate School of Management of Technology ===
- Professional Degree Course
  - System Safety

== Research and faculty programs ==
- The 21st Century Center Of Excellence Program (MEXT)
  - Creation of Hybridized Materials with Super-Functions and Formation of International Research & Education Center (2002–2006)
  - Global Renaissance by Green Energy Revolution (2003–2007)
- Support Program for Contemporary Educational Needs (MEXT)
  - Development of cyclical education that incorporates Geen Technology practices
- Program for Promoting High-Quality University Education (MEXT)
  - Practical Meister system of technological education
  - Restructuring of Fundamental Engineering Education based on Universal Design Concept

== History ==
- 1976 Nagaoka University of Technology was opened
- 1978 Matriculation ceremony of the first undergraduate class was held
- 1980 Graduate School (Master's program) was established
- 1986 Graduate School of Engineering (Doctoral program) was established
- 2000 Course was reorganized
- 2006 Integrated Bioscience and Technology course (Doctoral program) and System Safety (Professional Degree Course) was established
- 2012 Nuclear System Safety Engineering course (Master's program) was established
- 2015 Science of Technology Innovation (5-years Doctoral program) was established

== Research and instructional centers ==
- Center for Faculty Development
- Center for General Education
- Language Center
- Physical Education and Health Care Center
- Analysis and Instrumentation Center
- Technology Development Center
- Center for Machining Technology Development
- Extreme Energy-Density Research Institute
- Center for International Exchange and Education
- Center for e-Learning Research and Application
- Information Processing Center
- Radioisotope Center
- Sound and Vibration Engineering Center
- Center for Science and Mathematics
- Center for Multimedia System
- Techno-Incubation Center
- Research Center for Advanced Magnesium Technology
- Center for Green-Tech Development in Asia
- Research Center for Safe and Secure Society
- Advanced Methane-Utilization Research Center
- Gigaku Innovation Promotion Center
- Intellectual Property Center
- Top Runner Incubation Center for Academia-Industry Fusion
- Center for Integrated Technology Support (CITS)

== Presidents ==
1. Kawakami Masamitsu
2. Saito Shinroku
3. Kanno Masayoshi
4. Uchida Yasuzo
5. Hattori Ken
6. Kojima Yo
7. Niihara Koichi
8. Azuma Nobuhiko

== Location ==
Located in the suburb area of Nagaoka City in Niigata Prefucture, nearby the Echigo Hillside Park (national government park).

- By taxi about 20 minutes, By bus about 30min from Nagaoka Station (about 1 hour 40 minutes from Tokyo Station by Joetsu Shinkansen, Japanese bullet train)
- By car about 5 minutes from the Nagaoka Interchange on the Kan-etsu Expressway.
