= Toyohashi University of Technology =

National engineering university in Toyohashi, Japan

Coordinates: 34°42′06″N 137°24′31″E

- 豊橋技術科学大学
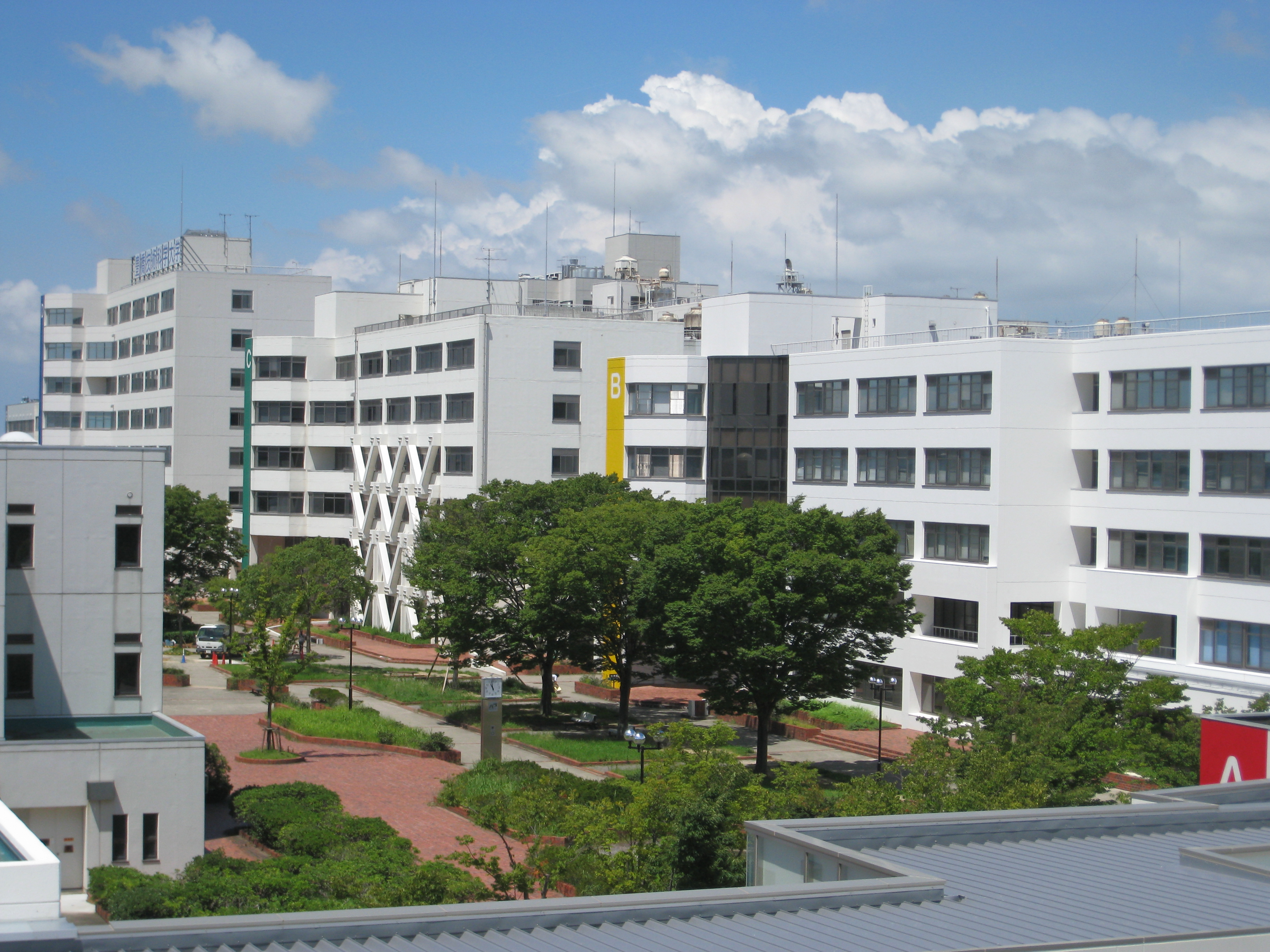
- Motto: Master Technology, Create Technology
- Type: National
- Established: 1976
- President: Takashi Onishi
- Undergraduates: 1,215 (2015)
- Postgraduates: 1,022 (2015)
- Location: Toyohashi, Aichi, Japan
- Campus: Suburban
- Nicknames: Toyohashi Tech, TUT, Gikadai
- Website: www.tut.ac.jp/english/

Toyohashi University of Technology (Japanese: 豊橋技術科学大学, Hepburn: Toyohashi Gijutsu Kagaku Daigaku), often abbreviated to Toyohashi Tech or TUT, is a national engineering university located in Toyohashi, Aichi, Japan. Distinguished for the upper-division student body where over 80% of them are transfer students from 5-year Technical Colleges called Kōsen, the Toyohashi Tech is one of the only two Universities of Technology (Gijutsu Kagaku Daigaku), a form of universities in Japan, the other being Nagaoka University of Technology. Toyohashi Tech is also noted for the fact that majority of the students proceed to graduate schools. The university is locally nicknamed Gikadai (技科大).

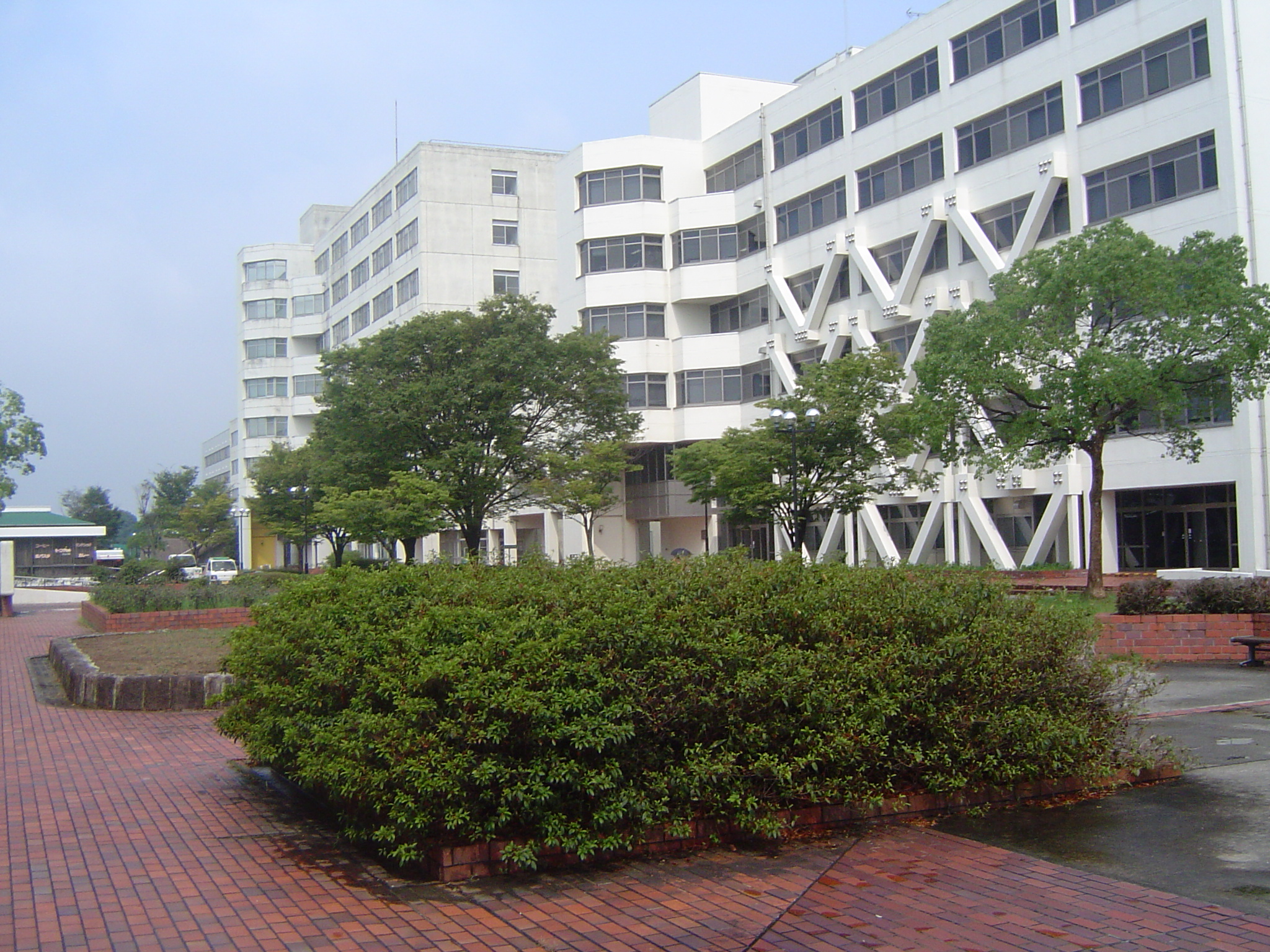

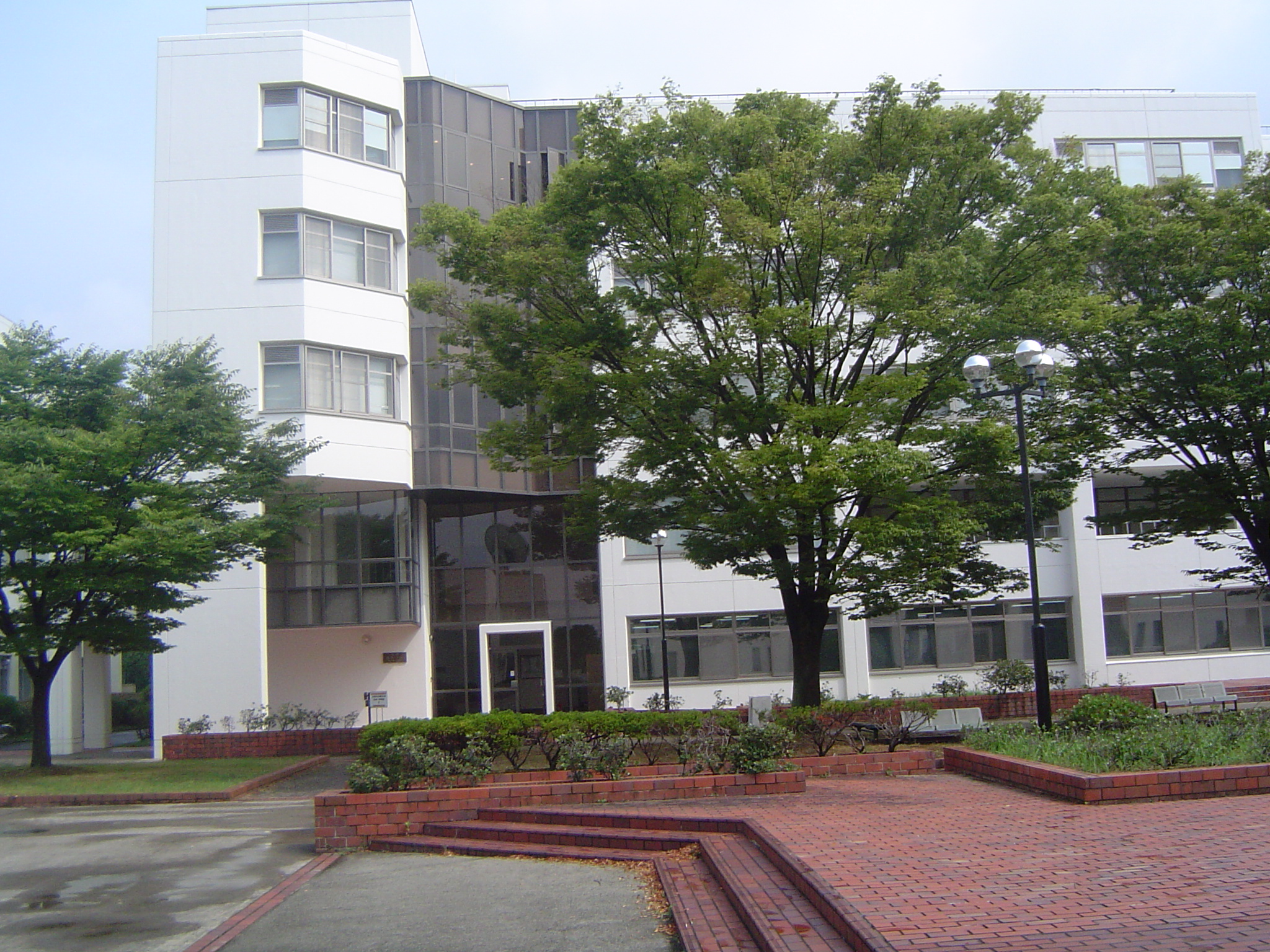
One of the buildings of Toyohashi University of Technology

== History ==
Toyohashi University of Technology was founded on October 1, 1976, after the government’s decision to establish the Graduate School of Science and Technology in Toyohashi city in 1974. This is based on the request from Japanese National Technical Colleges, to the Minister of Education in 1972.

== Organization ==
=== Undergraduate School ===
Departments of Engineering are reconstructed into 5 new departments from April 2010.

- Faculty of Engineering
  - Department of Mechanical Engineering
    - Mechanical System Design Course
    - Material and Manufacturing Course
    - System Control and Robotics Course
    - Environment and Energy Course
  - Department of Electrical and Electronic Information Engineering
    - Electronic Materials Course
    - Electrical System Course
    - Integrated Electronics Course
    - Information and Communication System Course
  - Department of Computer Science and Engineering
    - Computer and Information Science Course
    - Information and Systems Science Course
  - Department of Environmental and Life Sciences
    - Sustainable Development Course
    - Life and Materials Science Course
  - Department of Architecture and Civil Engineering
    - Architecture and Building Course
    - Civil and Environmental Engineering Course

=== Graduate school ===
- Master's and Doctoral Programs
  - Department of Mechanical Engineering
  - Department of Electrical and Electronic Information Engineering
  - Department of Computer Science and Engineering
  - Department of Environmental and Life Sciences
  - Department of Architecture and Civil Engineering

=== Research Institutes ===
Electronics-Inspired Interdisciplinary Research Institute

- Electronics-Inspired Interdisciplinary Research Institute (EIIRIS)
- Venture Business Laboratory (VBL)
- Incubation Center for Venture Business

Organization for International Affairs

- International Cooperation Center for Engineering Education Development
- Center for International Relations

Organization for Development of Innovative Research and technology

- Cooperative Research Facility Center
- Research Center for Future Vehicle City
- Research Center for Collaborative Area Risk Management
- Center for Human-robot Symbiosis Research
- Research Center for Agrotechnology and Biotechnology

Organization for the University Library and Computer Center

- University Library
- Information and media Center

Other

- Research Center for Physical Fitness, Sports and Health

== Notable alumni ==
=== Academia ===
- Daisuke Takahashi - a computer scientist
- Tomoyoshi Soga - a chemist at Keio University researching metabolomics

=== Literature ===
- Otsuichi - a novelist

=== Media ===
- Masayuki Ishii - a journalist

== Presidents ==
1. Yoneichiro Sakaki (1976–1984)
2. Namio Honda (1984–1990)
3. Shin'ichi Sasaki (1990–1996)
4. Keishi Gotō (1996–2002)
5. Tatau Nishinaga (2002–2008)
6. Yoshiyuki Sakaki (2008–present)
