= Ying-Hui Fu =

Taiwanese-American human geneticist

- 傅嫈惠
- Born: Taipei, Taiwan
- Education: National Chung Hsing University (BS, MS); Ohio State University (PhD)
- Spouse: Louis Ptáček
- Scientific career
- Fields: Molecular biology Biochemistry
- Workplaces: University of California, San Francisco
- Thesis: Studies of transformation and the nitrogen gene regulation in Neurospora crassa (1986)
- Doctoral advisor: George A. Marzluf
- Website: http://www.neugenes.org/outreach.htm

Ying-Hui Fu (Chinese: 傅嫈惠) is a Taiwanese molecular biologist and biochemist who has made important contributions to understanding the genetics of many neurological disorders. Her chief discoveries include describing Mendelian sleep phenotypes, identifying causative genes and mutations for circadian rhythm disorders, and characterizing genetic forms of demyelinating degenerative disorders. Fu is currently a professor of neurology at the University of California, San Francisco. She was elected to the US National Academy of Sciences in 2018.

== Background and education ==
=== Early career ===
In 1980, Fu received a degree in food science from National Chung Hsing University in Taiwan. In her study of food sciences, she was introduced to biochemistry and microbiology, which led her to study DNA manipulation. She then received her Ph.D. in biochemistry and molecular biology from Ohio State University in 1986. She continued to work at OSU for three more years in a post-doctoral position studying gene regulation in fungi. During her time at OSU, she cloned numerous genes important for nitrogen and sulfur metabolism in Neurospora. One of these genes, cys-3, encodes a leucine zipper protein. It was hypothesized that leucine zippers were DNA-binding elements. The first proof of this in living organisms was a mutation in the cys-3 leucine zipper, which caused a sulfur metabolism defect. After studying the mutation, Fu demonstrated that the mutated cys-3 was unable to bind DNA.

In 1989, Fu transferred to the Baylor College of Medicine as a post-doctoral fellow to study human genetics. While there, she was part of the team that identified the fragile-X syndrome gene. The gene contains a polymorphic CGG trinucleotide repeat in their DNA sequence; the repeat ranged from 6 to 54 in individuals with normal X chromosomes. The transition from stable to unstable occurred between 46 and 52 repeats. The instability increases the likelihood of fragile-X mental retardation. The repeats have a tendency to expand in transmission through meiosis. The size of the repeat correlates with severity of the disease. Fu cloned one of the genes responsible for a form of muscular dystrophy called myotonic dystrophy, and showed that an expanded trinucleotide repeat in this gene also was unstable and caused the disease. Together, these discoveries characterized the molecular basis of genetic "anticipation," the phenomenon of worsening severity in subsequent generations, as being due to unstable, expanded trinucleotide repeats.

=== Biomedical industry ===
After her postdoc position, Fu worked in biotech industry for four years before returning to academia. She worked first for two years from January 1993 - 1995 at Millennium Pharmaceutical Corporation, a biopharmaceutical company focused on oncology and inflammation (later acquired by Takeda Pharmaceutical Company). After leaving Millennium Pharmaceutical, from 1995- August 1997 Fu worked for Darwin Molecular Corporation for two years and took part in the search for mutations responsible for premature aging (Werner syndrome) and early onset Alzheimer's disease (presenilin 2).

=== Recent career ===
In 1997, Fu returned to academia, taking the position of associate professor of research at the University of Utah. Fu was then recruited to the University of California, San Francisco in 2002, where she is a co-principal investigator (PI) with her collaborator, Louis Ptacek. The lab's current projects include: locating human sleep genes, uncovering the molecular mechanisms of human sleep regulation and human circadian rhythms, investigating mouse models with de/dys-myelinating disease, and classifying miRNAs that contribute to healthy myelin.

== Research interests ==
=== Human sleep behaviors ===
==== Circadian rhythms and metabolism ====
Fu had her training in molecular biology and human genetics, but she became interested in circadian rhythms in 1996 when a woman came into a sleep clinic at the University of Utah, complaining that she had to go to bed very early and would wake up very early. This woman and her family would become the subject of study for Fu and her collaborator Louis Ptacek for familial advanced sleep phase syndrome (FASPS). They cloned the causative gene/mutation and studied the in vitro biochemical consequences of the mutation, culminating in a 2001 paper An hPer2 phosphorylation site mutation in familial advanced sleep-phase syndrome, reporting the first circadian gene mutation in humans.

==== Familial advanced sleep phase syndrome ====
In 2001, Fu and her collaborator's labs published a paper that explained a phenotype of extremely early risers in humans called Familial Advanced Sleep Phase Syndrome (FASPS). Humans with this autosomal dominant disease typically go to bed around 7:00 p.m. and wake up at 3:00 a.m. The lab studied the genomes of people with this trait and found a point mutation in the PER2 gene that likely causes the behavioral phenotype.

==== Short sleep phenotype ====
In 2009, Fu's group published a paper that explained the mechanisms of a short sleep phenotype in humans. In one family, carriers of the autosomal dominant phenotype sleep 6.25 hours compared to non-carrying family members, who sleep more than 8 hours per night. Fu traced the phenotype back to a point mutation in a gene called DEC2 that is associated with short sleep phenotype in humans. The mutant DEC2 has a proline-to-arginine switch at amino acid position 384, which causes the short sleep phenotype. Transgenic mice and flies with the mutant DEC2 showed similar phenotypes. It is not currently known what other molecules DEC2 interacts with to produce the short sleep phenotype.

=== Neurodegeneration ===
==== Trinucleotide repeat expansions and neurological diseases ====
When Fu did her post-doctoral work in Baylor College, she was part of the team that was positional cloning the Fragile-X syndrome gene. There, she studied the trinucleotide repeat sequence expansions, the mutations responsible for the Fragile-X Syndrome, and their correlation with disease severity and age of onset. This work led to the discovery of underlying molecular mechanism for genetic anticipation. Following this work, she cloned the gene responsible for Myotonic dystrophy based on the hypothesis that genetic anticipation in Myotonic dystrophy is also caused by trinucleotide repeat expansion on patient DNA. This mutational mechanism is now known to cause not only Fragile X syndrome and Myotonic dystrophy, but also Huntington's disease and many of the spinocerebellar ataxias. Thus, it is a common mutational mechanism in inherited neurological diseases.

==== Autosomal Dominant Leukodystrophy (ADLD) ====
In 2006, Fu's lab published a paper characterizing a mutation that led to ADLD in humans. Adult-onset autosomal dominant leukodystrophy (ADLD) is a neurological disorder that is associated with widespread myelin loss in the central nervous system. Fu's lab traced the phenotype back to individuals with an extra copy of nuclear laminar protein lamin B1 making ADLD one of the diseases named "laminopathies".

== Awards ==
- Sleep Science Award from the American Academy of Neurology (2006)
- Bauer Foundation Colloquium Distinguished Guest, Brandeis University, Boston, MA (2006)
- Distinguished Guest, Bollum Symposium, University of Minnesota, Minneapolis, MN (2008)
- Distinguished visiting professorship, Tamkang University, Taiwan (2009)
- Faculty Research Lecture in Basic Research, UCSF (2012)
- Presidential Lecture, University of Vermont (2012)
- Elected member, Academia Sinica (2018)
- Elected member, National Academy of Sciences (2018)
- Elected member, National Academy of Medicine (2018)
- Harvard Medical School Division of Sleep Medicine Prize (2021)

== Selected publications ==
- Toh, KL; Jones, CR; He, Y; Eide, EJ; Hinz, WA; Virshup, DM; Ptáček, LJ; Fu, Y-H (2001). "An hPer2 phosphorylation site mutation in familial advanced sleep-phase syndrome". Science. 291 (5506): 1040–3. Bibcode:2001Sci...291.1040T. doi:10.1126/science.1057499. PMID 11232563. S2CID 1848310.
- Xu, Y; Padiath, QS; Shapiro, RE; Jones, CR; Wu, SC; Saigoh, N; Saigoh, K; Ptáček, LJ; Fu, Y-H (2005). "Functional consequences of a CKIδ mutation causing familial advanced sleep phase syndrome". Nature. 434 (7033): 640–4. Bibcode:2005Natur.434..640X. doi:10.1038/nature03453. PMID 15800623. S2CID 4416575.
- Padiath, QS; Saigoh, K; Schiffman, R; Asahara, H; Koeppen, A; Hogan, K; Ptáček, LJ; Fu, Y-H (2006). "Lamin B1 duplications cause autosomal dominant leukodystrophy". Nat Genet. 38 (10): 1114–23. doi:10.1038/ng1872. PMID 16951681. S2CID 25336497.
- He, Y; Jones, CR; Fujiki, N; Xu, Y; Guo, B; Holder, J; Nishino, S; Fu, Y-H (2009). "Transcriptional suppressor DEC2 is a Regulator for Human Sleep Homeostasis". Science. 325 (5942): 866–70. doi:10.1126/science.1174443. PMC 2884988. PMID 19679812.
- Fu, YH; Marzluf, GA (1990). "cys-3, the positive-acting sulfur regulatory gene of Neurospora crassa, encodes a sequence-specific DNA-binding protein". J Biol Chem. 265 (20): 11942–11947. doi:10.1016/S0021-9258(19)38491-1. PMID 2142156.
- Fu, Y.H.; Kuhl, D.P.; Pizzuti; et al. (1991). "Variation of the CGG repeat at the fragile X site results in genetic instability: resolution of the Sherman paradox". Cell. 67 (6): 1047–1058. doi:10.1016/0092-8674(91)90283-5. PMID 1760838. S2CID 21970859.
- Fu, Y.H.; Pizzuti, A.; Fenwick, R.G. Jr.; et al. (1992). "An unstable triplet repeat in a gene related to myotonic muscular dystrophy". Science. 255 (5049): 1256–1258. Bibcode:1992Sci...255.1256F. doi:10.1126/science.1546326. PMID 1546326.
- Yu, C.E.; Oshima, J.; Fu, Y.H.; et al. (1996). "Positional cloning of the Werner's syndrome gene". Science. 272 (5259): 258–262. Bibcode:1996Sci...272..258Y. doi:10.1126/science.272.5259.258. PMID 8602509. S2CID 18172607.
- Levy; Lahad, E; Wasco, W; Poorkaj, P; Romano, DM; Oshima, J; Pettingell, WH; Yu, C; Jondro, PD; Schmidt, SD; Wang, K; Crowley, AC; Fu, Y-H; Guenette, SY; Galas, D; Nemens, E; Wejsman, EM; Bird, TD; Schellenberg, GD; Tanzi, RE (1995). "Candidate gene for the chromosome 1 familial Alzheimer's disease locus". Science. 269 (5226): 973–977. Bibcode:1995Sci...269..973L. doi:10.1126/science.7638622. PMID 7638622. S2CID 27296868.
- Xu, Y; Toh, KL; Jones, CR; Shin, JY; Fu, Y-H; Ptáček, LJ (2007). "Modeling of a human circadian mutation yields insights into clock regulation by PER2". Cell. 128 (1): 59–70. doi:10.1016/j.cell.2006.11.043. PMC 1828903. PMID 17218255.
- Kaasik, K; Kivimäe, S; Allen, JJ; Chalkley, RJ; Huang, Y; Baer, K; Kissel, H; Burlingame, AL; Shokat, KM; Ptáček, LJ; Fu, Y-H (Feb 2013). "Glucose Sensor O-GlcNAcylation Coordinates with Phosphorylation to Regulate Circadian Clock". Cell Metab. 17 (2): 291–302. doi:10.1016/j.cmet.2012.12.017. PMC 3597447. PMID 23395175.
- Brennan, KC; Bates, EA; Shapiro, RE; Zyuzin, J; Hallows, WC; Huang, Y; Lee, HY; Jones, CR; Fu, YH; Charles, AC; Ptacek, LJ (2013). "Casein kinase iδ Mutations in Familial Migraine and Advanced Sleep Phase". Science Translational Medicine. 183 (5): 183ra56, 1–11. doi:10.1126/scitranslmed.3005784. PMC 4220792. PMID 23636092.
- He, Y; Jones, CR; Fujiki, N; Xu, Y; Guo, B; Holder, J; Nishino, S; Fu, Y-H (2009). "Transcriptional suppressor DEC2 is a Regulator for Human Sleep Homeostasis". Science. 325 (5942): 866–70. doi:10.1126/science.1174443. PMC 2884988. PMID 19679812.
- Kaasik, K; Kivimäe, S; Allen, JJ; Chalkley, RJ; Huang, Y; Baer, K; Kissel, H; Burlingame, AL; Shokat, KM; Ptáček, LJ; Fu, YH (2013). "Glucose sensor O-GlcNAcylation coordinates with phosphorylation to regulate circadian clock". Cell Metab. 17 (2): 291–302. doi:10.1016/j.cmet.2012.12.017. PMC 3597447. PMID 23395175.

== See also ==
- Neuroscience of sleep
