= Japanese destroyer Sakaki =

Two Japanese destroyers have been named Sakaki:

- Japanese destroyer Sakaki (1915), a Kaba-class destroyer launched in 1915 and stricken in 1931
- Japanese destroyer Sakaki, a Tachibana-class destroyer laid down in 1944 but scrapped incomplete on slip in 1945
