= PER3 =

Protein and coding gene in humans

Identifiers
- Aliases: PER3, GIG13, FASPS3, period circadian clock 3, period circadian regulator 3
- External IDs: OMIM: 603427; MGI: 1277134; GeneCards: PER3

Gene location (Human)
Chr.	Chromosome 1 (human)
Band	1p36.23	Start	7,784,291 bp
Band	1p36.23	End	7,845,177 bp

Gene location (Mouse)
Chr.	Chromosome 4 (mouse)
Band	4|4 E2	Start	151,003,652 bp
Band	4|4 E2	End	151,044,665 bp
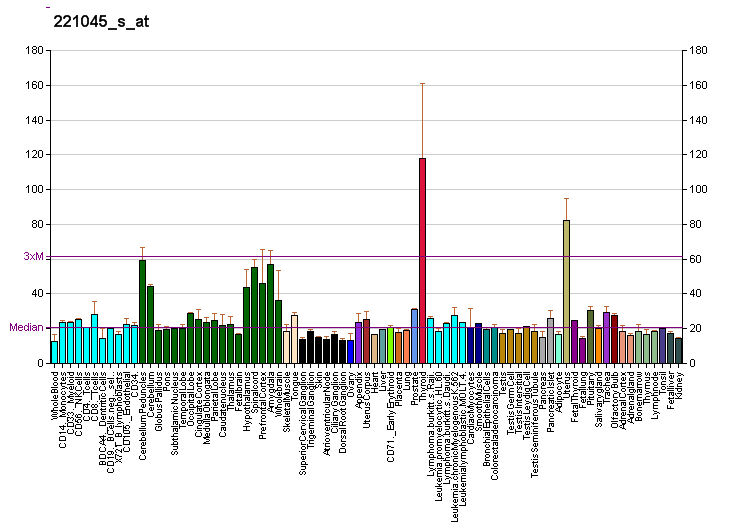
RNA expression pattern
Bgee	Human / Mouse (ortholog); Top expressed in: sural nerve; parietal pleura; cerebellar vermis; tibia; cerebellar hemisphere; Achilles tendon; right hemisphere of cerebellum; visceral pleura; gastric mucosa; Skeletal muscle tissue of rectus abdominis / Top expressed in: ciliary body; vestibular membrane of cochlear duct; neural layer of retina; saccule; Rostral migratory stream; primary oocyte; skin of external ear; superior frontal gyrus; lacrimal gland; secondary oocyte; More reference expression data
BioGPS	More reference expression data
Gene ontology
Molecular function	ubiquitin protein ligase binding; kinase binding; protein binding; transcription cis-regulatory region binding; transcription corepressor binding; transcription factor binding
Cellular component	cytoplasm; nucleus
Biological process	circadian rhythm; circadian regulation of gene expression; rhythmic process; regulation of transcription, DNA-templated; transcription, DNA-templated; regulation of circadian sleep/wake cycle, sleep; protein stabilization; negative regulation of transcription by RNA polymerase II; response to light stimulus; entrainment of circadian clock by photoperiod
Sources:Amigo / QuickGO
Orthologs
Databases	NCBI: entry; OMA: entry
Species	Human	Mouse
Entrez	8863	18628
Ensembl	ENSG00000049246	ENSMUSG00000028957
UniProt	P56645	O70361
RefSeq (mRNA)	NM_001289861; NM_001289862; NM_001289863; NM_001289864; NM_016831 NM_001377275; NM_001377276	NM_011067; NM_001289877; NM_001289878
RefSeq (protein)	NP_001276790; NP_001276791; NP_001276792; NP_001276793; NP_058515 NP_001364204; NP_001364205	NP_001276806; NP_001276807; NP_035197
Location (UCSC)	Chr 1: 7.78 – 7.85 Mb	Chr 4: 151 – 151.04 Mb
PubMed search
- Wikidata
View/Edit Human	View/Edit Mouse

The PER3 gene encodes the period circadian protein homolog 3 protein in humans. PER3 is a paralog to the PER1 and PER2 genes. It is a circadian gene associated with delayed sleep phase syndrome in humans.

== History ==
The Per3 gene was independently cloned by two research groups (Kobe University School of Medicine and Harvard Medical School) who both published their discovery in June 1998. The mammalian Per3 was discovered by searching for homologous cDNA sequences to Per2. The amino acid sequence of the mouse PERIOD3 protein (mPER3) is between 37-56% similar to the other two PER proteins.

== Function ==
This gene is a member of the Period family of genes. It is expressed in a circadian pattern in the suprachiasmatic nucleus (SCN), the primary circadian pacemaker in the mammalian brain. Genes in this family encode components of the circadian rhythms of locomotor activity, metabolism, and behavior. Circadian expression in the SCN continues in constant darkness, and a shift in the light/dark cycle evokes a proportional shift of gene expression in the SCN. PER1 and PER2 are necessary for molecular timekeeping and light responsiveness in the master circadian clock in the SCN, but little data is shown on the concrete function for PER3. PER3 was found to be important for endogenous timekeeping in specific tissues and those tissue-specific changes in endogenous periods result in internal misalignment of circadian clocks in Per3 double knockout (-/-) mice. PER3 may have a stabilizing effect on PER1 and PER2, and this stabilizing effect may be reduced in the PER3-P415A/H417R polymorphism.

== Role in chronobiology ==
The RNA levels of mPer3 oscillate with a circadian rhythm in both the SCN and in the eyes, as well as in peripheral tissues, including the liver, skeletal muscle, and testis. Unlike Per1 and Per2, of which the mRNA is induced in response to light, Per3 mRNA in the SCN does not respond to light. This suggests that Per3 may be regulated differently than either Per1 or Per2.

The mPER3 protein contains a PAS domain, similar to mPER1 and mPER2. Likely, mPER3 binds to other proteins using this domain. However, while PER1/2 have been shown to be important in the transcription-translation feedback loop involved in the intracellular circadian clock, the influence of PER3 in this loop has not yet been fully elucidated, given that mPER3 does not appear to be functionally redundant to mPER1 and mPER2. mPer3 may not be a member of the core clock loop at all.

== Animal studies ==
While the Per3 gene is a paralog to the PER1 and PER2 genes, studies in animals generally show that it does not contribute significantly to circadian rhythms. Functional Per3-/- animals experience only small changes in free-running period, and do not respond significantly differently to light pulses. Per1-/- and Per2-/- animals experience a significant change in free-running period; however, knocking out Per3 in addition to either Per1 or Per2 has little effect on free-running rhythms. Furthermore, Per1-/-Per2-/- mice are completely arrhythmic, indicating that these two genes have much more importance to the biological clock than Per3.

Per3 knockout mice experience a slightly shortened period of locomotor activity (by 0.5 hr) and are less sensitive to light, in that they entrain more slowly to changes in the light-dark cycle. PER3 may be involved in the suppression of behavioral activity in response to light, although mPer3 expression is not necessary for circadian rhythms.

== Clinical significance ==
The PER3 "length" polymorphism in the 54-bp repeat sequence in exon 18 (GenBank accession no. AB047686) is a structural polymorphism due to an insertion or deletion of 18 amino acids in a region encoding a putative phosphorylation domain. The polymorphism has been associated with diurnal preference and delayed sleep phase syndrome. A longer allele polymorphism is associated with "morningness" and the short allele with "eveningness." The short allele is also associated with delayed sleep phase syndrome. The length polymorphism has also been shown to inhibit adipogenesis and Per3 knockout mice were shown to have increased adipose tissue and decreased muscle tissue compared to wild type. Additionally, the presence of the length polymorphism has also been shown to be associated with type 2 diabetes mellitus (T2DM) patients as compared to non-diabetic control patients. The PER3-P415A/H417R polymorphism has been linked to familial advanced sleep phase syndrome in humans, as well as to seasonal affective disorder, though when knocked in to mice, the polymorphism causes a delayed sleep phase.

== Gene ==
=== Orthologs ===
The following is a list of some orthologs of the PER3 gene in other species:

- PER3 (P. troglodytes)
- PER3 (M. mulatta)
- PER3 (C. lupus)
- PER3 (H. sapiens)
- PER3 (B. taurus)
- Per3 (M. musculus)
- Per3 (R. norvegicus)
- PER3 (G. gallus)
- per3 (X. tropicalis)
- per3 (D. rerio)

=== Paralogs ===
- PER1
- PER2

=== Gene location ===
The human PER3 gene is located on chromosome 1 at the following location:

- Start: 7,784,320 bp
- Finish: 7,845,181 bp
- Length: 60,862 bases
- Exons: 25

PER3 has 19 transcripts (splice variants).

=== Protein structure ===
The PER3 protein has been identified to have the following features:

- Size: 1201 amino acids
- Molecular mass: 131888 Da
- Quaternary structure: Homodimer

=== Post translational modifications ===
The following are some known post transcriptional modifications to the Per3 gene:

- Phosphorylation by CSNK1E is weak and appears to require association with PER1 and translocation to the nucleus.
- Ubiquitinated.
- Modification sites at PhosphoSitePlus
- Modification sites at neXtProt
