= Phyllis Zee =

American neurologist

Phyllis C. Zee
- Scientific career
- Fields: Neurology
- Workplaces: Northwestern University

Phyllis C. Zee is the Benjamin and Virginia T. Boshes Professor in Neurology, the director of the Center for Circadian and Sleep Medicine (CCSM) and the chief of the Division of Sleep Medicine (neurology) at the Feinberg School of Medicine, Northwestern University, Chicago. She is also the medical director of Sleep Disorders Center at Northwestern Memorial Hospital.

== Career ==
As director of CCSM, Zee oversees an interdisciplinary program in basic and translational sleep and circadian rhythm research, and findings from her team have paved the way for innovative approaches to improve sleep and circadian health. Zee is the founder of the first circadian medicine clinic in the US, where innovative treatments are available for patients with circadian rhythm disorders.

A central theme of her research program is understand the role of circadian-sleep interactions on the expression and development of cardiometabolic and neurologic disorders. Zee's research has focused on the effects of age and neurodegeneration on sleep and circadian rhythms and pathophysiology of circadian sleep-wake disorders. In addition, her laboratory is studying the effects of circadian-sleep based interventions, such as exercise, bright light and feed-fast schedules on cognitive, cardiovascular and metabolic functions and their potential to delay cardiometabolic aging and neurodegeneration. Recently her research team has also been interested in the use of acoustic and electrical neurostimulation to enhance slow wave sleep and memory in older adults.

Zee also has authored more than 300 peer reviewed original articles, reviews and chapters on the topics of sleep, circadian rhythms, and sleep/wake disorders. She has also trained over 50 pre-doctoral and post-doctoral students and has mentored numerous faculty members. Zee is a fellow of the American Academy of Sleep Medicine, fellow of the American Academy of Neurology and member of the American Neurological Association. She has served on numerous national and international committees, NIH scientific review panels, and international advisory boards. She is past president of the Sleep Research Society, past president of the Sleep Research Society Foundation and past chair of the NIH Sleep Disorders Research Advisory Board. Dr. Zee is a Member of the NIH National Heart Lung and Blood Advisory Council. She is the recipient of the 2011 American Academy of Neurology Sleep Science Award and the 2014 American Academy of Sleep Medicine academic honor, the William C. Dement Academic Achievement Award.
