= Period circadian protein homolog 1 =

Protein-coding gene in the species Homo sapiens

PER1
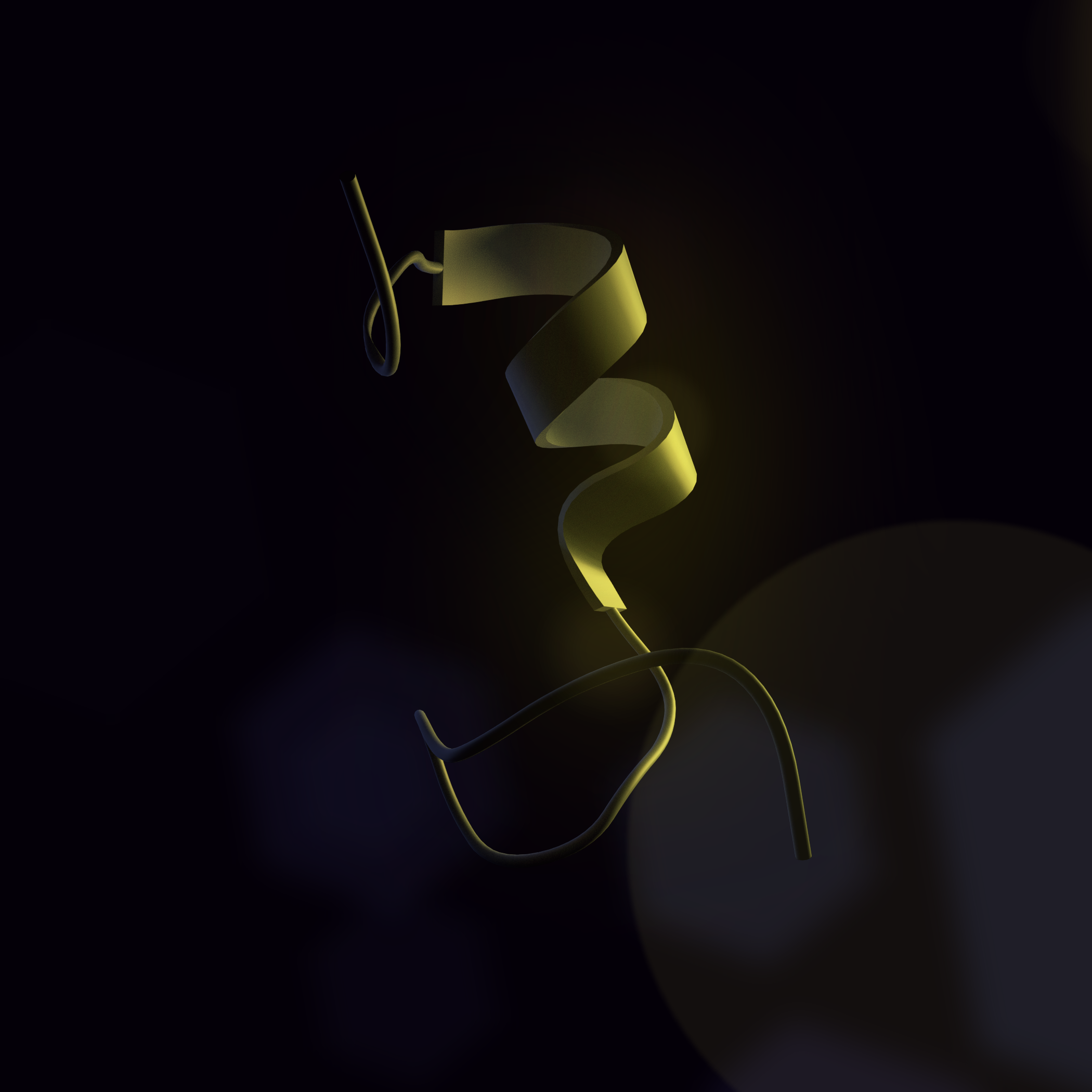

Identifiers
- Aliases: PER1, PER, RIGUI, hPER, period circadian clock 1, period circadian regulator 1
- External IDs: OMIM: 602260; MGI: 1098283; GeneCards: PER1
Available structures
PDB	Ortholog search: PDBe RCSB
PDB	List of PDB id codes 1UL6

Gene location (Human)
Chr.	Chromosome 17 (human)
Band	17p13.1	Start	8,140,472 bp
Band	17p13.1	End	8,156,506 bp

Gene location (Mouse)
Chr.	Chromosome 11 (mouse)
Band	11|11 B3	Start	68,986,043 bp
Band	11|11 B3	End	69,000,786 bp
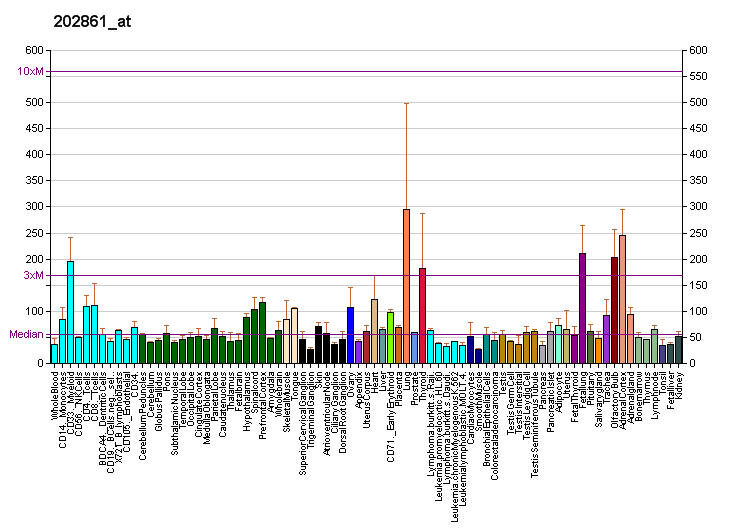

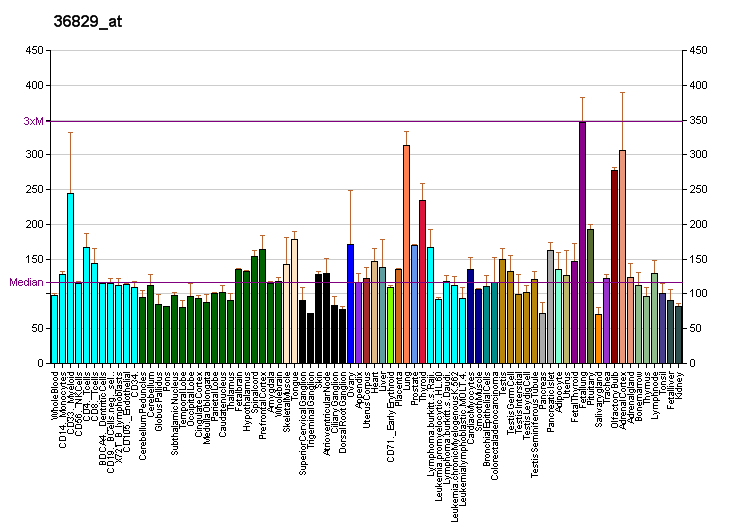
RNA expression pattern
Bgee	Human / Mouse (ortholog); Top expressed in: gastric mucosa; tibial nerve; skin of leg; skin of abdomen; right ovary; left ovary; tibial arteries; right lung; left uterine tube; anterior pituitary / Top expressed in: granulocyte; muscle of thigh; superior frontal gyrus; plantaris muscle; extensor digitorum longus muscle; neural layer of retina; lacrimal gland; ankle; primary visual cortex; stroma of bone marrow; More reference expression data
BioGPS	More reference expression data
Gene ontology
Molecular function	transcription factor binding; transcription cis-regulatory region binding; RNA polymerase II cis-regulatory region sequence-specific DNA binding; E-box binding; kinase binding; chromatin DNA binding; ubiquitin protein ligase binding; protein binding; transcription corepressor binding
Cellular component	cytoplasm; nucleus; nucleoplasm; cytosol
Biological process	histone H3 deacetylation; negative regulation of glucocorticoid receptor signaling pathway; regulation of transcription, DNA-templated; response to light stimulus; regulation of cytokine production involved in inflammatory response; regulation of sodium ion transport; rhythmic process; negative regulation of transcription by RNA polymerase II; negative regulation of I-kappaB kinase/NF-kappaB signaling; circadian regulation of gene expression; transcription, DNA-templated; entrainment of circadian clock; negative regulation of JNK cascade; circadian regulation of translation; regulation of circadian rhythm; circadian rhythm; histone H3 acetylation; regulation of hair cycle; histone H4 acetylation; posttranscriptional regulation of gene expression; response to cAMP; regulation of p38MAPK cascade; negative regulation of transcription, DNA-templated; entrainment of circadian clock by photoperiod; positive regulation of transcription by RNA polymerase II
Sources:Amigo / QuickGO
Orthologs
Databases	NCBI: entry; OMA: entry
Species	Human	Mouse
Entrez	5187	18626
Ensembl	ENSG00000179094	ENSMUSG00000020893
UniProt	O15534	O35973
RefSeq (mRNA)	NM_002616	NM_001159367; NM_011065
RefSeq (protein)	NP_002607	NP_001152839; NP_035195
Location (UCSC)	Chr 17: 8.14 – 8.16 Mb	Chr 11: 68.99 – 69 Mb
PubMed search
- Wikidata
View/Edit Human	View/Edit Mouse

Period circadian protein homolog 1 is a protein in humans that is encoded by the PER1 gene.

== Function ==
The PER1 protein is important to the maintenance of circadian rhythms in cells, and may also play a role in the development of cancer. This gene is a member of the period family of genes. It is expressed with a daily oscillating circadian rhythm, or an oscillation that cycles with a period of approximately 24 hours. PER1 is most notably expressed in the region of the brain called the suprachiasmatic nucleus (SCN), which is the primary circadian pacemaker in the mammalian brain. PER1 is also expressed throughout mammalian peripheral tissues. Genes in this family encode components of the circadian rhythms of locomotor activity, metabolism, and behavior. Circadian expression of PER1 in the suprachiasmatic nucleus will free-run in constant darkness, meaning that the 24-hour period of the cycle will persist without the aid of external light cues. Subsequently, a shift in the light/dark cycle evokes a proportional shift of gene expression in the suprachiasmatic nucleus. The time of gene expression is sensitive to light, as light during a mammal's subjective night results in a sudden increase in per expression and thus a shift in phase in the suprachiasmatic nucleus. Alternative splicing has been observed in this gene; however, these variants have not been fully described. There is some disagreement between experts over the occurrence of polymorphisms with functional significance. Many scientists state that there are no known polymorphisms of the human PER1 gene with significance at a population level that results in measurable behavioral or physiological changes. Still, some believe that even silent mutations can cause significant behavioral phenotypes, and result in major phase changes.

Functional conservation of the PER gene is shown in a study by Shigeyoshi et al. 2002. In this study, mouse mPer1 and mPer2 genes were driven by Drosophila timeless promoter in Drosophila melanogaster. They found that both mPer constructs could restore rhythm to arrhythmic flies (per01 flies). Thus mPer1 and mPer2 can function as clock components in flies and may have implications concerning the homology of per genes.

=== Role in chronobiology ===
The PER1 gene, also called rigui, is a characteristic circadian oscillator. PER1 is rhythmically transcribed in the SCN, keeping a period of approximately 24 hours. This rhythm is sustained in constant darkness, and can also be entrained to changing light cycles. PER1 is involved in generating circadian rhythms in the SCN, and also has an effect on other oscillations throughout the body. For example, PER1 knockouts affect food entrainable oscillators and methamphetamine-sensitive circadian oscillators, whose periods are altered in the absence of PER1. In addition, mice with knockouts in both the PER1 and PER2 genes show no circadian rhythmicity. Phase shifts in PER1 neurons can be induced by a strong, brief light stimulus to the SCN of rats. This light exposure causes increases in PER1 mRNA, suggesting that the PER1 gene plays an important role in entrainment of the mammalian biological clock to the light-dark cycle.

=== Feedback mechanism ===
The PER1 mRNA is expressed in all cells, acting as a part of a transcription-translation negative feedback mechanism, which creates a cell autonomous molecular clock. PER1 transcription is regulated by protein interactions with its five E-box and one D-box elements in its promoter region. Heterodimer CLOCK-BMAL1 activates E-box elements present in the PER1 promoter, as well activating the E box promoters of other components of the molecular clock such as PER2, CRY1, and CRY2. The phase of PER1 mRNA expression varies between tissues, The transcript leaves the nucleus and is translated into a protein with PAS domains, which enable protein-protein interactions. PER1 and PER2 are phosphorylated by CK1ε, which leads to increased ubiquitylation and degradation. This phosphorylation is counteracted by PP1 phosphatase, resulting in a more gradual increase in phosphorylated PER, and an additional control over the period of the molecular clock. Phosphorylation of PER1 can also lead to masking of its leucine-rich nuclear localization sequence and thus impeded heterodimer import.

PER interacts with other PER proteins as well as the E-box regulated, clock controlled proteins CRY1 and CRY2 to create a heterodimer which translocates into the nucleus. There it inhibits CLOCK-BMAL activation. PER1 is not necessary for the creation circadian rhythms, but homozygous PER1 mutants display a shortened period of mRNA expression. While PER1 must be mutated in conjunction with PER2 to result in arhythmiticity, the two translated PER proteins have been shown to have slightly different roles, as PER1 acts preferentially through interaction with other clock proteins.

== Clinical significance ==
PER1 expression may have significant effects on the cell cycle. Cancer is often a result of unregulated cell growth and division, which can be controlled by circadian mechanisms. Therefore, a cell's circadian clock may play a large role in its likelihood of developing into a cancer cell. PER1 is a gene that plays an important role in such a circadian mechanism. Its overexpression, in particular, causes DNA-damage induced apoptosis. In addition, down-regulation of PER1 can enhance tumor growth in mammals. PER1 also interacts with proteins ATM and Chk2. These proteins are key checkpoint proteins in the cell cycle. Cancer patients have a lowered expression of per1. Gery, et al. suggests that regulation of PER1 expression may be useful for cancer treatment in the future.

== Gene ==
=== Orthologs ===
The following is a list of some orthologs of the PER1 gene in other species:

- PER1 (Rattus norvegicus)
- PER1 (Mus musculus)
- per1a (Danio rerio)
- PER1 (Homo sapiens)
- lin-42 (Caenorhabditis elegans)
- PER1 (Bos taurus)
- per1b (Danio rerio)
- PER (Drosophila melanogaster)
- PER1 (Xenopus tropicalis)
- PER1 (Equus caballus)
- PER1 (Macaca mulatta)
- PER1 (Sus scrofa)

=== Paralogs ===
- PER2
- PER3

=== Location ===
The human PER1 gene is located on chromosome 17 at the following location:

- Start: 8,140,470
- Finish: 8,156,405
- Length: 15,936
- Exons: 24

PER1 has 19 transcripts (splice variants).

== Discovery ==
The PER1 ortholog was first discovered by Ronald Konopka and Seymour Benzer in 1971. During 1997, Period 1 (mPer1) and Period 2 (mPer2) genes were discovered (Sun et al., 1997 and Albretch et al., 1997). Through homology screens with the Drosophila per, these genes were discovered. It was independently discovered by Sun et al. 1997, naming it RIGUI and by Tei et al. 1997, who named it hper because of the protein sequence similarity with Drosophila per. They found that the mouse homolog had the properties of a circadian regulator. It had circadian expression in the suprachiasmatic nucleus (SCN), self-sustained oscillation, and entrainment of circadian expression by external light cues.
