= Yoshiyuki Sakaki =

Japanese molecular biologist

Yoshiyuki Sakaki (榊 佳之, Sakaki Yoshiyuki) is a Japanese molecular biologist. He was the sixth president of Toyohashi University of Technology and an emeritus professor of the University of Tokyo.

Sakaki was born in Nagoya. He received a bachelor's degree in biochemistry from the University of Tokyo, and received a Ph.D. in biochemistry from the University of Tokyo in 1971.

== Awards ==
- 1999: Platinum Technology 21st Century Pioneer Partnership Award, Smithsonian Institution
- 2001: Chevalier dans l'ordre des Palmes Academiques, France
- 2001: Moosa Award, Biochemical Society of the Republic of Korea
- 2001: Award of Japanese Society of Human Genetics
- 2003: The Chunichi Cultural Prize, Chu-nichi Culture Foundation
- 2003: Medal with Purple Ribbon, Japanese Government
