= PER2 =

Protein found in mammals

Identifiers
- Aliases: PER2, FASPS, FASPS1, period circadian clock 2, period circadian regulator 2
- External IDs: OMIM: 603426; MGI: 1195265; GeneCards: PER2
Available structures
PDB	Ortholog search: PDBe RCSB
PDB	List of PDB id codes 3GDI, 4CT0, 4U8H

Gene location (Human)
Chr.	Chromosome 2 (human)
Band	2q37.3	Start	238,244,044 bp
Band	2q37.3	End	238,290,102 bp

Gene location (Mouse)
Chr.	Chromosome 1 (mouse)
Band	1|1 D	Start	91,343,704 bp
Band	1|1 D	End	91,387,046 bp
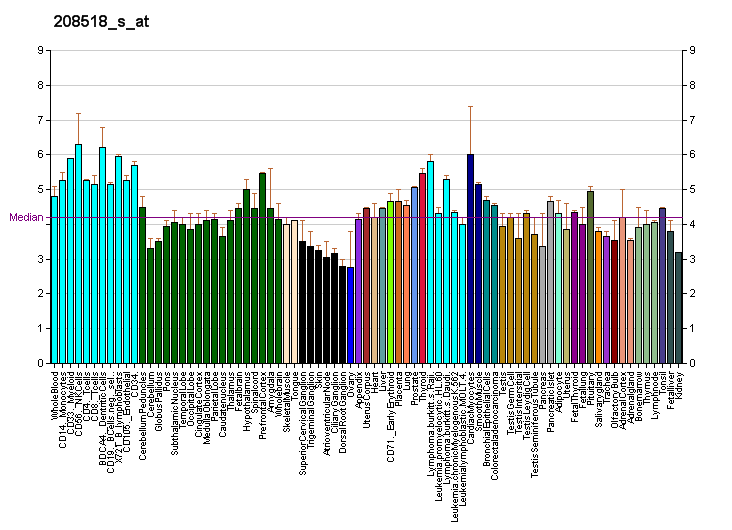

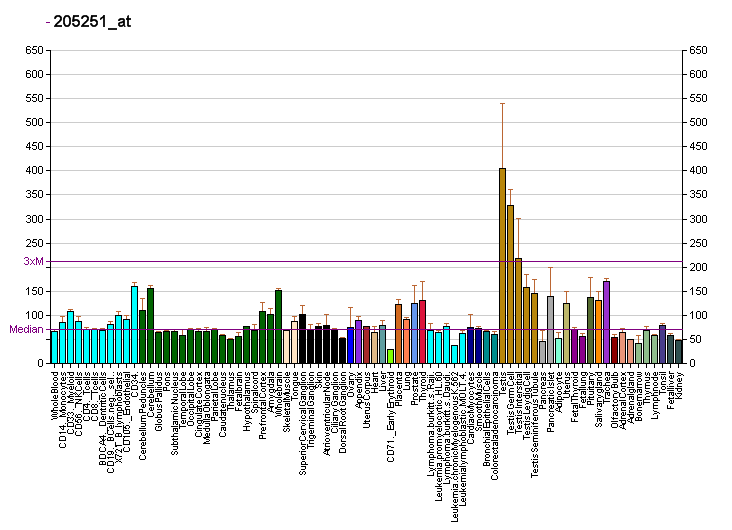
RNA expression pattern
Bgee	Human / Mouse (ortholog); Top expressed in: oocyte; mucosa of paranasal sinus; secondary oocyte; bronchial epithelial cell; palpebral conjunctiva; nasal epithelium; tail of epididymis; urethra; caput epididymis; skin of thigh / Top expressed in: adrenal gland; left lung lobe; suprachiasmatic nucleus; granulocyte; rectum; lacrimal gland; median eminence; primary motor cortex; lobe of cerebellum; respiratory epithelium; More reference expression data
BioGPS	More reference expression data
Gene ontology
Molecular function	transcription coactivator activity; transcription cis-regulatory region binding; protein binding; transcription corepressor binding; transcription factor binding
Cellular component	nucleolus; perinuclear region of cytoplasm; nucleus; cytoplasm
Biological process	histone H3 deacetylation; gluconeogenesis; regulation of transcription, DNA-templated; regulation of insulin secretion; rhythmic process; negative regulation of fat cell proliferation; negative regulation of circadian rhythm; negative regulation of transcription by RNA polymerase II; circadian regulation of gene expression; transcription, DNA-templated; fatty acid metabolic process; regulation of cell cycle; negative regulation of protein ubiquitination; circadian regulation of translation; response to ischemia; regulation of vasoconstriction; glycogen biosynthetic process; negative regulation of transcription regulatory region DNA binding; regulation of circadian rhythm; circadian rhythm; white fat cell differentiation; regulation of glutamate uptake involved in transmission of nerve impulse; lactate biosynthetic process; negative regulation of transcription, DNA-templated; regulation of neurogenesis; positive regulation of nucleic acid-templated transcription; response to light stimulus; entrainment of circadian clock by photoperiod; positive regulation of cold-induced thermogenesis
Sources:Amigo / QuickGO
Orthologs
Databases	NCBI: entry; OMA: entry
Species	Human	Mouse
Entrez	8864	18627
Ensembl	ENSG00000132326	ENSMUSG00000055866
UniProt	O15055	O54943
RefSeq (mRNA)	NM_003894; NM_022817	NM_011066
RefSeq (protein)	NP_073728	NP_035196
Location (UCSC)	Chr 2: 238.24 – 238.29 Mb	Chr 1: 91.34 – 91.39 Mb
PubMed search
- Wikidata
View/Edit Human	View/Edit Mouse

PER2 is a protein in mammals encoded by the PER2 gene. PER2 is noted for its major role in circadian rhythms.

== Discovery ==
The per gene was first discovered using forward genetics in Drosophilla melanogaster in 1971. Mammalian Per2 was discovered by in 1997 through a search for homologous cDNA sequences to PER1. It is more similar to Drosophila per than its paralogs. Later experiments in also identified Per2 in humans.

== Function ==
PER2 is a member of the Period family of genes and is expressed in a circadian pattern in the suprachiasmatic nucleus, the primary circadian pacemaker in the mammalian brain. Genes in this family encode components of the circadian clock, which regulates the daily rhythms of locomotor activity, metabolism, and behavior. Circadian expression of these genes and their encoded proteins in the suprachiasmatic nucleus. Human PER2 is involved in human sleep disorders and cancer formation. Lowered PER2 expression is common in many tumors cells within the body, suggesting PER2 is integral for proper function and decreased levels promotes tumor progression.

PER2 contains glucocorticoid response elements (GREs) and a GRE within the core clock gene PER2 is continuously occupied during rhythmic expression and essential for glucocorticoid regulation of PER2 in vivo. Mice with a genomic deletion spanning this GRE expressed elevated leptin levels and were protected from glucose intolerance and insulin resistance on glucocorticoid treatment but not from muscle wasting. PER2 is an integral component of a particular glucocorticoid regulatory pathway and that glucocorticoid regulation of the peripheral clock is selectively required for some actions of glucocorticoids.

PER2 expression in mice is increased by exposure to 13,000 lumens of intense daylight such as sunshine while decreasing troponin levels in equal opposite amounts. PER2 in turn enhances oxygen-efficient glycolysis and hence provides cardioprotection from ischemia. Therefore, it is speculated that strong light may reduce the risk of heart attacks and decrease the damage after experiencing one. Moreover, PER2 has protective functions in liver diseases, as it antagonizes hepatitis C viral replication.

Per2 knockout mice experience a free-running period of around 21.8 hours, compared to the normal mouse free-running period of 23.3 hours. Some of the Per2 knockout mice can also become arrhythmic under constant light conditions. PER2 has also been shown to be possibly important in the development of cancer. PER2 expression is significantly lower in human patients with lymphoma and acute myeloid leukemia.

The PER2 protein seems to be important for the proliferation of osteoblasts, which aid in adding density to the bone through a pathway utilizing Myc and Ccnd1. Certain PER2 mutations have shown that they can increase the tolerance to the amount of alcohol that a mouse can intake through reduced uptake of glutamate.

=== Main interactions ===
In mammals, mPER2 forms a heterodimer with mPER1, mCRY1, and mCRY2 by binding to PAS domains. The heterodimer acts to inhibit their own transcription by suppressing the CLOCK/BMAL1 complex resulting in a negative feedback loop. This negative feedback loop is essential for maintaining a functioning circadian clock. A disruption of either both mPER1 and mPER2 genes together or both mCRY genes causes behavioural arrhythmicity when the double-knockout animals are placed in constant conditions. A third PER gene, mPer3, does not have a critical role in the maintenance of the core clock feedback loops. Molecular and behavioural rhythms are preserved in mice lacking mPer3.

=== Interactions with CK1e ===
PER2 has been shown to interact with a kinase called CK1e. CK1e phosphorylates PER2 in mammals. In Syrian hamster, a mutation called tau has been discovered in the CK1e, which increases phosphorylation of homologous PER2 leading to a faster degradation and a shortened period. Mutations in hPER2 can cause FASPS because of a lack of phosphorylation site in the mutated hPER2 protein.

=== Interaction table ===
	Peak of mRNA	Peak of Protein	Protein Motifs	PER1, PER3	PER1, CRY1, CRY2	PER2 binding to Clock/Bmal1	CK1E
PER2	ZT 6	ZT 12	PAS domain	Binds together through PAS domain	Forms heterodimer to inhibit Clock/Bmal1	PER2 inhibits its own transcription through inhibition of Clock/Bmal1.	Phosphorylates PER2

== Clinical significance ==
A genetic test from a cheek swab can use PER2 expression levels to tell whether a person is an early morning person or a "night owl".

=== Familial advanced sleep phase ===
Familial advanced sleep phase (FASP) is characterized as a short period (e.g. 23.3 vs 24.3hr for population) in humans. A mutation in hPER2 decreases its phosphorylation by CK1d, which causes the phenotype seen in some FASP. The primary cause of these FASP is a mutation that changes amino acid 662 from serine to glycine (S662G) in PER2. The S662G mutation makes PER2 mutant protein a stronger repressor than normal PER2, decreasing cellular PER2 levels and therefore causing this form of FASP. The mutation also seems to cause an increase in the turnover rate of PER2 in the nucleus.

== Gene ==
The PER2 gene is located on the long (q) arm of chromosome 2 at position 37.3 and has 25 exons.

Predicted human PER2 protein created from the PER2 gene shares 44% identity with human PER1 and 77% identity with mouse Per2. Northern blots analysis revealed that PER2 was expressed as a 7-kb mRNA in all tissues examined. An additional 1.8-kb transcript was also detected in some tissues. PER2 mRNA has been shown to peak at ZT 6 in the SCN.

== See also ==
- PER1
- PER3
- Familial sleep traits
