= Skene (surname) =

Skene is a surname of Scottish origin. Notable people with the surname include:

- Alan Skene (1932–2001), South African rugby footballer
- Alexander Skene (1837–1900), Scottish gynaecologist
- Clyde Skene (1884–1945), Scottish footballer
- Debra J. Skene, South African and British chronobiologist
- Felicia Skene (1821–1899), Scottish author
- George Skene (physician) (1741–1803), Scottish physician
- George Skene (politician) (1749–1825), Scottish soldier and politician
- George Skene (provost) (1619–1708), Provost of Aberdeen
- James Skene (1775–1864), Scottish lawyer and friend of Sir Walter Scott
- James Henry Skene (1812–1886), Scottish author, traveller and British Consul at Aleppo
- John Skene (New Jersey official), third deputy governor of West Jersey, 1684–92
- John Skene, Lord Curriehill (c.1543–1617), Scottish prosecutor, ambassador, and judge
- Leslie Skene (1882–1959), Scottish footballer
- Lilias Skene (1627–1697), Scottish Quaker preacher, prophet and poet
- Philip Skene (1725–1810), British Army officer and New York landowner
- Robert Skene (British Army officer) (1719–1787), British Army officer and MP
- Robert Skene (polo player) (1914–1997), American polo player
- Robert Skene (cricketer) (1908–1988), English cricketer
- William Forbes Skene (born 1809), Scottish historian and antiquary
