= Skene =

Skene may refer to:

- Skene, Aberdeenshire, a community in North East Scotland, United Kingdom
- Skene, Mississippi, an unincorporated community in Mississippi, United States
- Skene, Sweden, a village now part of Kinna, Sweden
- Skene (automobile), an American steam automobile manufactured by Skene American Automobile Company from 1900 to 1901
- Skene Boats, Canadian manufacturer
- Skene (theatre), a part of a classical Greek theatre
- Clan Skene, a Lowland Scottish clan
- Skene! Records, a record label based in Minneapolis, Minnesota

== People with the surname ==
- Skene (surname)

== See also ==
- Skene's glands, glands on the anterior wall of the vagina in human anatomy
- Skenes
