= William Forbes Skene =

Scottish lawyer, historian and antiquary

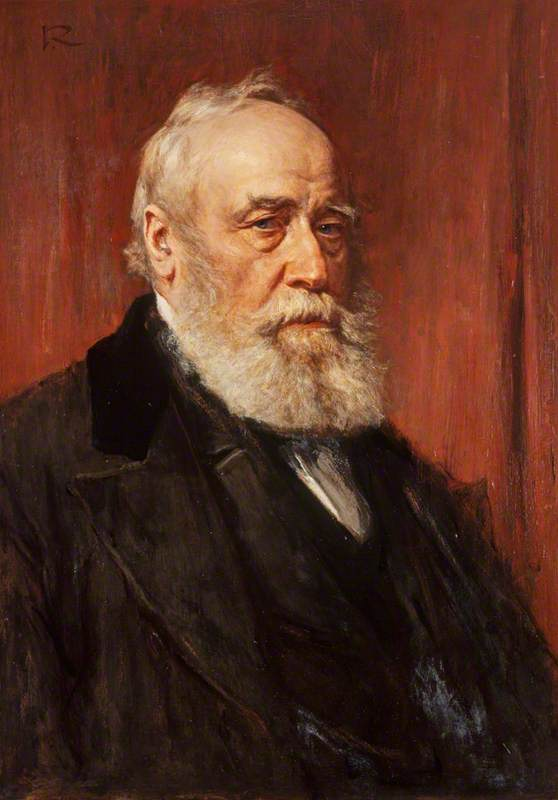
A portrait of Skene by Sir George Reid, c. 1888

William Forbes Skene WS FRSE FSA(Scot) DCL LLD (7 June 1809 – 29 August 1892), was a Scottish lawyer, historian and antiquary.

He co-founded the Scottish legal firm Skene Edwards which was prominent throughout the 20th century but disappeared in 2008 when it merged with Morton Fraser.

== Life ==
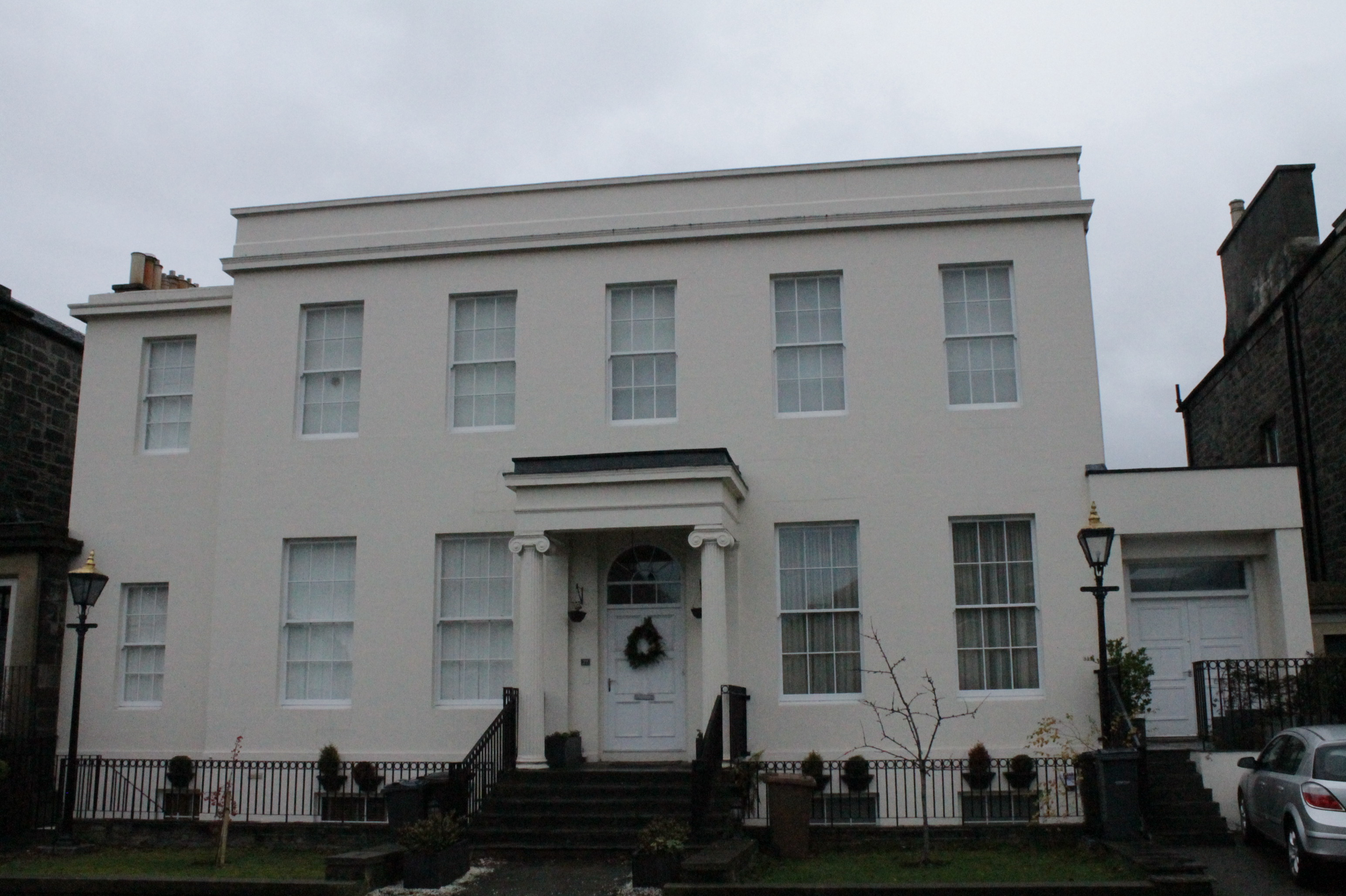
27 Inverleith Row in Edinburgh

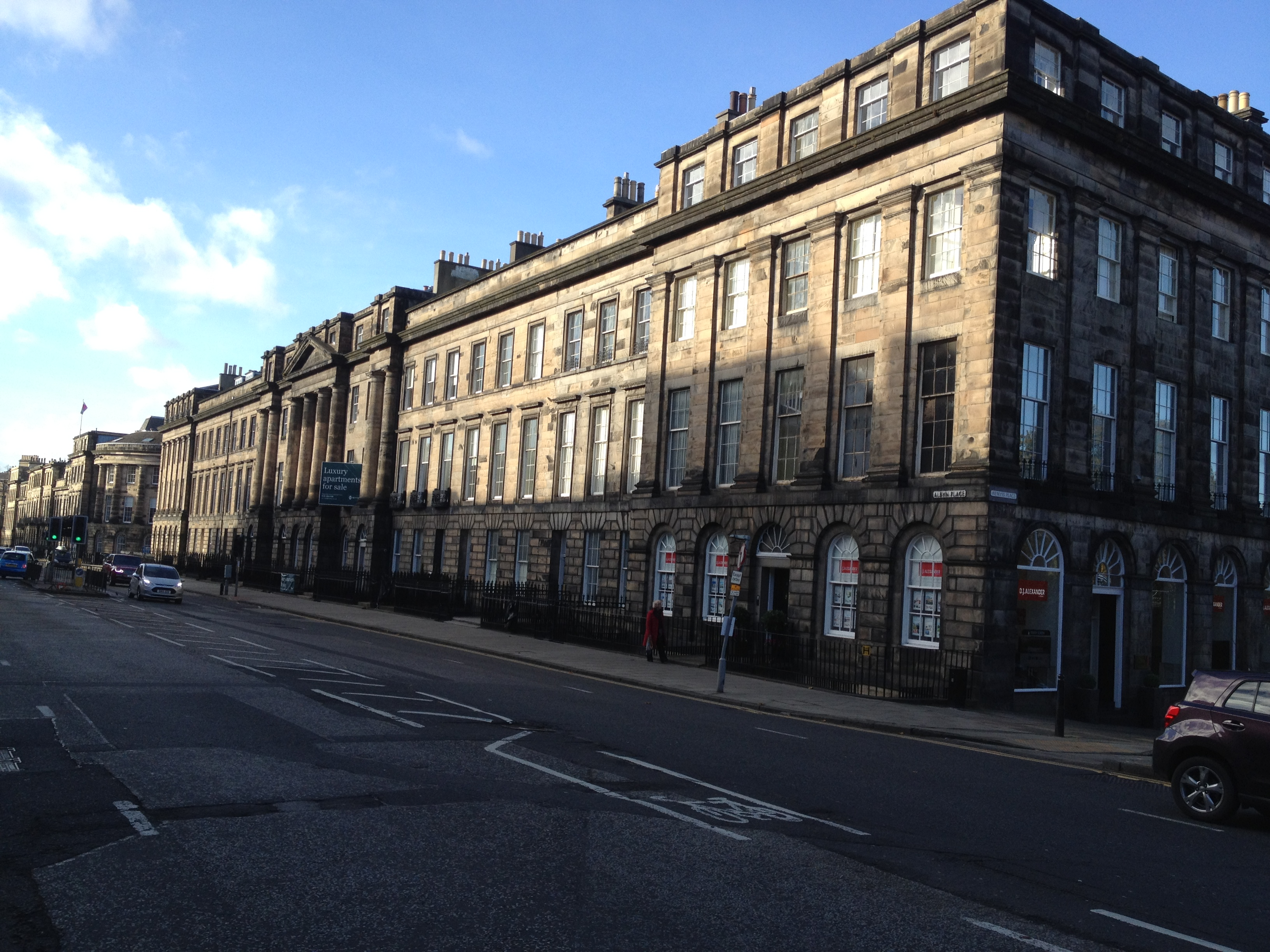
Skene's offices at 5 Albyn Place (centre)

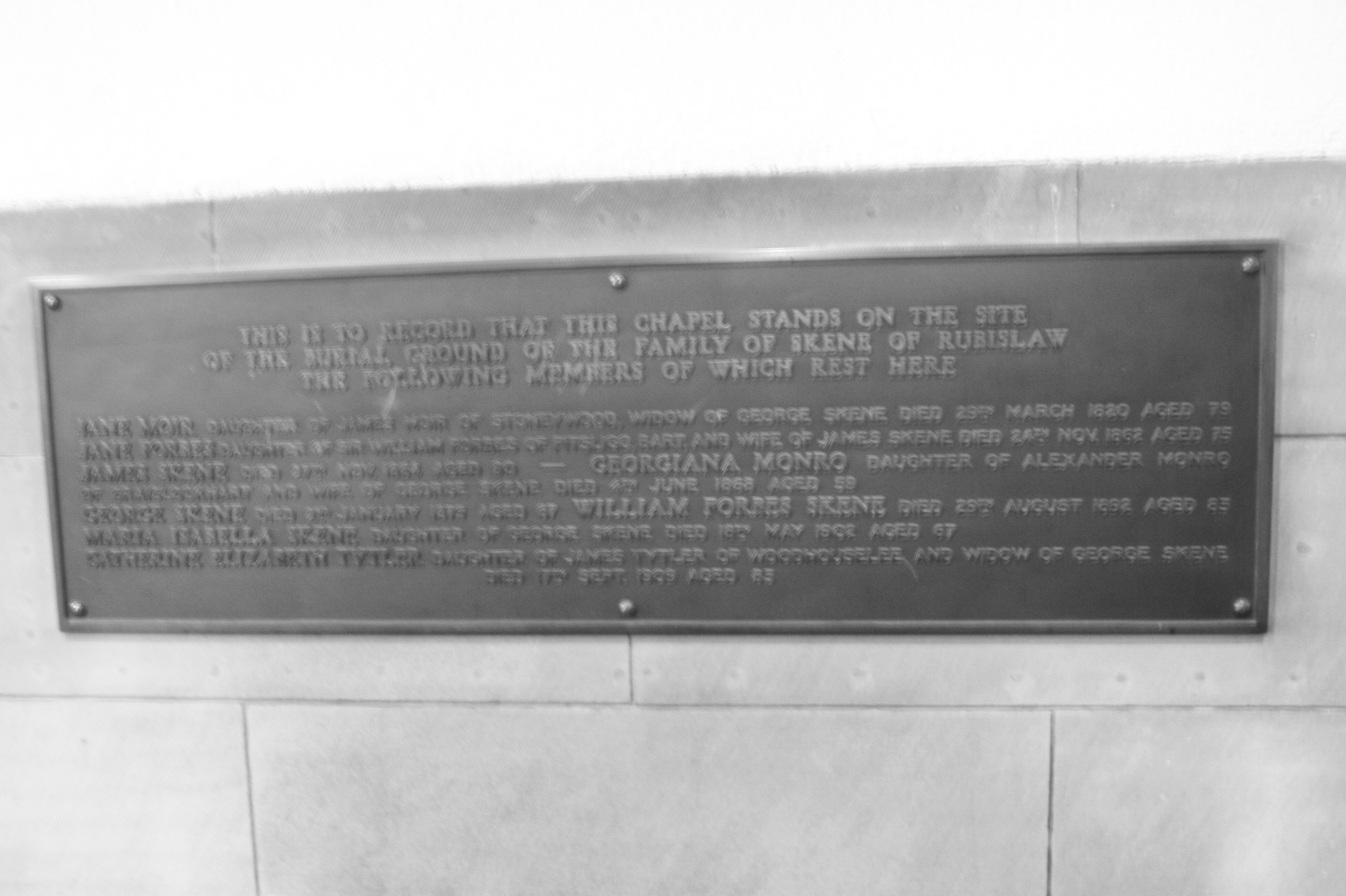
Memorial plaque to the Skene family graves, St John's, Edinburgh

He was born in Inverey, Aberdeenshire, the second son of Sir Walter Scott's friend, James Skene (1775–1864), of Rubislaw, near Aberdeen, and his wife, Jane Forbes, daughter of Sir William Forbes, 6th Baronet of Pitsligo. His siblings included James Henry Skene and Felicia Skene.

The family moved to Edinburgh in 1817, originally living with his uncle, Andrew Skene then from 1820 living at 126 Princes Street facing Edinburgh Castle.

He was educated at the High School in Edinburgh. He was then apprenticed as a lawyer first to Francis Wilson WS at Parliament Square then to Henry Jardine WS also at Parliament Square.

He then studied law at the University of St Andrews and Edinburgh University, also taking a special interest in the study of Celtic philology and literature. In 1832, he became a Writer to the Signet (WS), and shortly afterwards obtained an official appointment in the bill department of the Court of Session, which he held until 1865. His early interest in the history and antiquities of the Scottish Highlands bore its first fruit in 1837, when he published The Highlanders of Scotland, their Origin, History and Antiquities.

In 1847, during the Highland Potato Famine, he was appointed Secretary to the Central Board for Highland Relief. In this position he worked closely with Sir Charles Trevelyan, Assistant Secretary to the Treasury.

In 1859 he was elected a Fellow of the Royal Society of Edinburgh his proposer being Cosmo Innes. He served as the society's vice president from 1869 to 1871.

His chief work, however, is his Celtic Scotland, a History of Ancient Alban (3 vols., Edinburgh, 1876–1880), perhaps the most important contribution to Scottish history written during the 19th century. In 1879 he was made a Doctor of Civil Law (DCL) of the University of Oxford, and in 1881 Historiographer Royal for Scotland. He was appointed a Deputy Lieutenant of Edinburgh in 1886.

William Forbes Skene was a leading member of the congregation of the Anglican St Vincent's Chapel in Stockbridge in north Edinburgh. He is commemorated there by a prominent memorial on the south wall of the nave. An avowed Evangelical, he had argued that, since the Scottish Episcopal Church's General Synod of 1863 had established the English Book of Common Prayer as the primary authority for the Church's worship and the Scottish Episcopal Church had adopted the Church of England's Thirty-nine Articles as a doctrinal yardstick, for St Vincent's to remain outside that church could no longer be justified.

In his final years he had offices at 5 Albyn Place on the Moray Estate and lived at 27 Inverleith Row.

He died unmarried and childless in Edinburgh on 29 August 1892. He is buried with his family in St John's Episcopal Churchyard on Princes Street. The graves lie in the south-east chapel and are marked by a bronze plaque.

== Publications ==
The most important of Skene's other works are: editions of John of Fordun's Chronica gentis Scotorum (Edinburgh, 1871–1872); of the Four Ancient Books of Wales (Edinburgh, 1868); of the Chronicles of the Picts and Scots (Edinburgh, 1867); and of Adomnán's Vita S. Columbae (Edinburgh, 1874); an Essay on the Coronation Stone of Scone (Edinburgh, 1869); and Memorials of the Family of Skene of Skene (Aberdeen, 1887), Celtic Scotland (1880) One of Skene's harshest critics was the Scottish philologist Alexander Macbain.

== See also ==
- Kathleen Scott
- MS 1467, a mediaeval Gaelic manuscript 'discovered', transcribed and translated by Skene
