= Beinn Dearg (Ullapool) =

Mountain in the Inverlael area of the Highlands of Scotland

Coordinates: 57.78561°N 4.93005°W

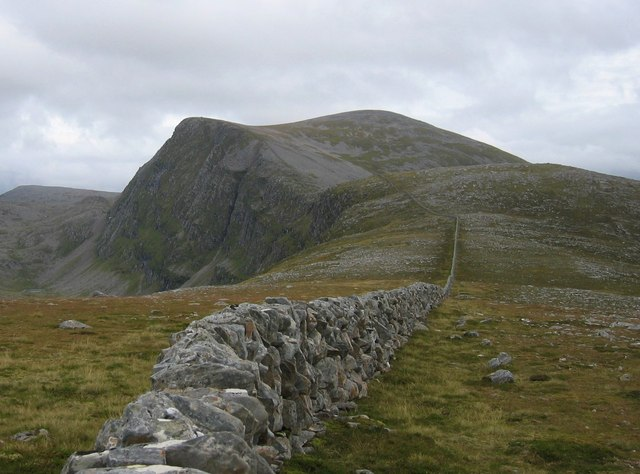

Highest point
- Elevation: 1,084 m (3,556 ft)
- Prominence: c. 810 m (Ranked 34th in British Isles)
- Parent peak: Sgùrr Mòr
- Listing: Munro, Marilyn

Naming
- English translation: Red mountain
- Language of name: Gaelic
- Pronunciation: Scottish Gaelic: [peɲ ˈtʲɛɾɛk] English approximation: bayn DYERR-ek

Geography
- Location: Wester Ross, Scotland
- OS grid: NH259811
- Topo map: Ordnance Survey Landranger 20

Beinn Dearg (one of a number of Scottish hills of that name) is a mountain in the Inverlael area of the Highlands of Scotland. It is most frequently climbed by following the River Lael up Gleann na Sguaib. Starting from near the head of Loch Broom, a path follows the glen to a bealach, which is about one kilometre (1/2 mile) north of the summit. From this bealach, the neighbouring peaks of Cona' Mheall and Meall na Ceapraichean may also be climbed. Eididh nan Clach Geala, which lies about three kilometres (two miles) north of Beinn Dearg, is also added in to complete a round of four Munros.

During early 2005, strong winds caused much damage to trees in the Inverlael Forest, almost completely blocking the route described.

Beinn Dearg is designated as a Special Protection Area. The area encompasses a diverse range of habitats, including woodland, mire, open water, dwarf-shrub heath, and cliffs. Most significantly, the summit areas support specialist mountain birds such as breeding dotterel Charadrius morinellus and golden eagle Aquila chrysaetos.
