= Henry Jardine =

Scottish solicitor and antiquarian

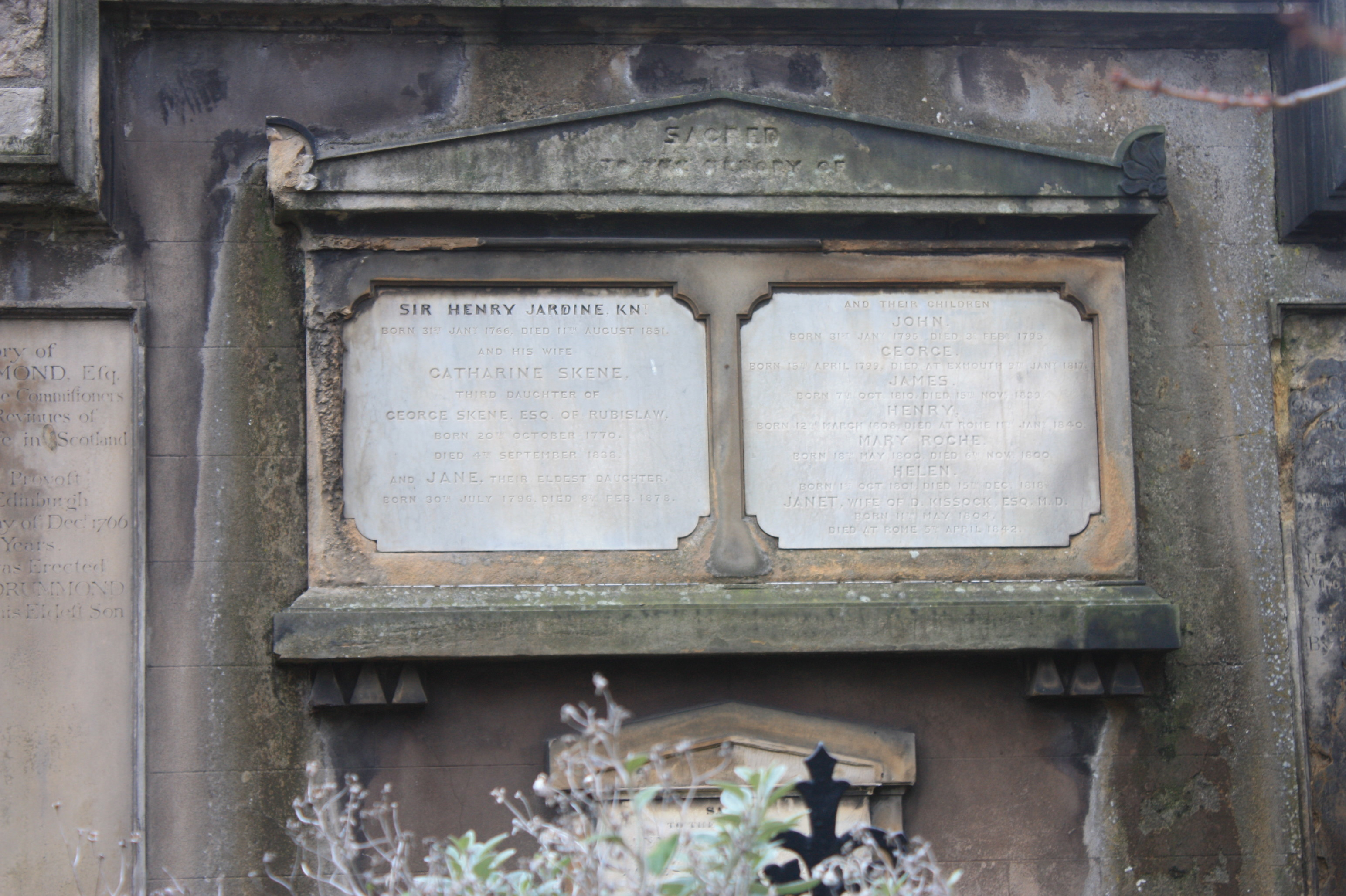
The grave of Sir Henry Jardine, Canongate Kirkyard, Edinburgh.

Sir Henry Jardine of Harwood WS FRSE (30 January 1766 – 11 August 1851) was a solicitor, antiquarian and a founder member of the Bannatyne Club in 1823, with his friend Sir Walter Scott.

== Life ==
He was born in Edinburgh on 30 January 1766. He was the son of Reverend John Jardine (1716–1766), "second charge" minister of the Tron Kirk on the Royal Mile and Dean of the Chapel Royal, and Jean Drummond, daughter of George Drummond, the Lord Provost of Edinburgh. His father died when Henry was 4 months old but his grandfather George Drummond provided assistance.

He attended the High School in Edinburgh and then studied law at the University of Edinburgh. After graduation he was apprenticed to John Davidson WS based on Castlehill on the Royal Mile. He qualified as a Writer to the signet in 1790.

In 1790 he was winner of the Edinburgh Arrow as finest archer in the Royal Company of Archers.

He became a Writer to the Signet in 1790 and in 1793 began the important government role of Solicitor of Taxes, as a result of the patronage of Henry Dundas, 1st Viscount Melville. From 1820 until 1831 he was King's remembrancer in the exchequer during the reign of King George IV.

In 1814 he was elected a Fellow of the Royal Society of Edinburgh. His proposers were George Steuart Mackenzie (his son-in-law), Henry Mackenzie, and Thomas Charles Hope. In 1818 he was of those present with Sir Walter Scott at the rediscovery of the Honours of Scotland. In November 1819 he was present at the opening of the grave of Robert Bruce, inspection of the remains, and the re-interment in a new leaden coffin which was then filled completely with hot pitch to exclude air and preserve the bones.

During the 1820s one of his apprentices in his rooms at Parliament Square was William Forbes Skene. He was one of the Directors organising the construction of the National Monument of Scotland. He was also a Director of the Bank of Scotland and Manager of the Edinburgh Orphan Hospital and on the Committee for the Deaf and Dumb Institution.

He was knighted by King George IV in 1825.

He retired in 1837 with a pension of £1,400 per annum, a considerable sum for the time. In 1838 he was Vice President of the Society of Antiquaries of Scotland and by this stage was also Brigadier General of the Royal Company of Archers.

He died on 11 August 1851 aged 85 at his home 123 Princes Street in Edinburgh.

He is buried in Canongate Churchyard alongside his grandfather, George Drummond, just west of the entrance gate.

A bursary was founded in his name at the University of Edinburgh by George Parker Bidder, whose education at the university had been assisted by Jardine.

== Freemasonry ==
Jardine Affiliated to Lodge Holyrood House (St Luke's), No.44, on 21 February 1783. He had previously been Initiated into Scottish Freemasonry in Lodge Canongate Kilwinning, No.2.

== Family ==
He married Catherine Skene (died 1838) in 1794. She was the sister of Andrew Skene and James Skene of Rubislaw. They had six daughters and four sons. His daughter Catherine Jardine (died 1857) married twice: firstly to Captain John Street of the Royal Artillery; secondly to Sir George Steuart Mackenzie. His youngest daughter Henrietta Jardine (1805–1862) married Dr. William Cullen (1798–1828), grandson of William Cullen the physician.

== Publications ==
- Report Relative to the Tomb of King Robert the Bruce and the Cathedral Church of Dunfermline.
