= John Burnett (advocate) =

Scottish advocate, judge and legal scholar

John Burnett or John Burnet FRSE (1763 – 8 December 1810) was a Scottish advocate, judge and legal scholar.

== Life ==
He was the son of William Burnett of Monboddo, an advocate in Aberdeen, where he was born in 1763.

He was admitted advocate at Edinburgh University on 10 December 1785. In 1792 he was appointed advocate-depute, and in October 1803 was made Sheriff of Haddington. In April 1810 he became Judge Admiral of Scotland. He was also for some time counsel for the city of Aberdeen.

In 1791 he was elected a Fellow of the Royal Society of Scotland being proposed by Daniel Rutherford and Archibald Alison.

He died on 7 December 1810, while his work on the Criminal Law of Scotland was passing through the press. It was published in 1811. Though in certain respects imperfect and misleading, it is a work of great merit, the more especially that it is one of the earliest attempts to form a satisfactory collection of decisions in criminal cases.

His role as Judge Admiral was succeeded by William Boswell, advocate.

Burnett was Counsel for the City of Aberdeen and was replaced by Andrew Skene upon his death.

== Family ==
He married Deborah Paterson in 1802.

== Publications ==
- A Treatise on Various Branches of the Criminal Law in Scotland (co-written with Robert Craigie)
