= Skenes =

Skenes may refer to:

== People ==
- Paul Skenes, American baseball player
- Joshua Skenes, founder of Angler, a restaurant in San Francisco, California

== Place ==
- Skenes Creek, Victoria

== See also ==
- Skene
