= Shift plan =

Central component of a shift schedule in shift work

The shift plan, also known as a rota or roster (esp. British), is the central component of a shift schedule in shift work. The schedule includes considerations of shift overlap, shift change times and alignment with the clock, vacation, training, shift differentials, holidays, etc. The shift plan determines the sequence of work (W) and free (F) days within a shift system.

== Notation ==
A notation used often identifies day (D), swing (S) and night (N) shifts for the W days and O (off) for rest days.

W
work days

D
day shift, 1st shift, early shift
This shift often occurs from either 06:00 or 07:00 to either 14:00 or 15:00 for eight-hour shifts, and from 06:00 to 18:00 for twelve-hour shifts.
S
swing shift, 2nd shift, late shift, back shift, afternoon shift
This shift often occurs from either 14:00 or 15:00 to either 22:00 or 23:00 for eight-hour shifts, and is not used with twelve-hour shifts.
N
night shift, 3rd shift, graveyard shift
This shift often occurs from either 22:00 or 23:00 to either 06:00 or 07:00 for eight-hour shifts, and from 18:00 to 06:00 for twelve-hour shifts.

F
free days

O
days off
This is defined as a day on which a shift does not begin.

A~F
work teams (starts from A as first team)

Note that a worker transitioning from N to O works for the first six or seven hours of the first day "off". Thus, when days off follow night shifts, the first one or more days "off" are, in fact, days of recovery from lack of nighttime sleep. This daily notation refers to the start of a shift. If a shift starts at 23:00, then this is a W day even though only one hour is worked. The day after this shift is an F day if no shift starts on this day, though many hours have been worked from midnight on.

One shift system may allow many shift plans. For example, the twelve-hour, 2nW:2nF system with n = 1 allows twelve different plans in three serially-identical sets. Within a set, DONO has the same sequence as NODO. DNOO is the preferred sequence because days off follow night work and there are two consecutive days off.

Shift plans may also be expressed by assigning shifts and days off to calendar dates. In this form, a repeating sequence such as DDNNOOOO is applied to successive dates, with each symbol indicating the corresponding shift or day off.

== Three-day shift plans ==
Prior to 2014, the U.S. Navy used a three shift system with an 18-hour day instead of a 24-hour day. The 24-hour period was divided into four shifts: 00:00-06:00, 06:00-12:00, 12:00-18:00, and 18:00-00:00. A sailor stood watch on their shift. During the off shift there is time to perform maintenance, study for qualifications, and handle collateral duties. During off time the sailor has time to sleep, relax, and perform personal tasks, such as laundry. With sufficient personnel, a given watchstation may benefit from a fourth man (the midnight cowboy or "Balls-to-6"). He would stand the same 6-hour watch in a given 24-hour period, usually from midnight to 06:00 (hence the midnight portion of the name, often shortened to cowboy) and the normal watchstander would then be free. This gave rise to a schedule of six on, twelve off, six on, thirty off, six on, twelve off.

Beginning in 2014, the Submarine Force began shifting to a 24-hour day, with watches split into 8 hours on, 16 hours off. This does have the side effect of sailors assigned to a certain shift having the same meals every day, and so the shifts are periodically rotated in order to provide variety.

The Surface Fleet began its shift in 2017, transitioning from their "five and dimes" approach of 5 hours on, 10 hours off.

This does not apply to the attached air wing, which will work a 12 on, 12 off schedule 7 days a week.

Navy three-shift example
Time	Mon				Tue				Wed				Thu				Fri				Sat				Sun			
Time	on	watch	off	AW	on	watch	off	AW	on	watch	off	AW	on	watch	off	AW	on	watch	off	AW	on	watch	off	AW	on	watch	off	AW
06:00–12:00	C	A	B	D	B	C	A	D	A	B	C	D	C	A	B	D	B	C	A	D	A	B	C	D	C	A	B	D
12:00–18:00	B	C	A	E	A	B	C	E	C	A	B	E	B	C	A	E	A	B	C	E	C	A	B	E	B	C	A	E
18:00–06:00	A	B	C	E	C	A	B	E	B	C	A	E	A	B	C	E	C	A	B	E	B	C	A	E	A	B	C	E
Plan	Run 1												Run 2												Run 3			

== 4-day shift plans ==
In the 12/24/12/48 or 12/24 plan, employees work in shifts of 12 hours; first a "daily shift" (e.g. 07:00 to 18:00), followed by 24 hours' rest, This plan needs four teams for full coverage, and makes an average 42-hour workweek. The pattern repeats in a 4-week cycle, i.e. over 28 days, and has 14 shifts per employee therein.

12/24/12/48 shift example
Time		Week 1							Week 2							Week 3							Week 4						
Time		Mon	Tue	Wed	Thu	Fri	Sat	Sun	Mon	Tue	Wed	Thu	Fri	Sat	Sun	Mon	Tue	Wed	Thu	Fri	Sat	Sun	Mon	Tue	Wed	Thu	Fri	Sat	Sun
Daily	06:00–18:00	a	C	D	B	a	C	D	B	a	C	D	B	a	C	D	B	a	C	D	B	a	C	D	B	a	C	D	B
Nightly	18:00–06:00	B	a	C	D	B	a	C	D	B	a	C	D	B	a	C	D	B	a	C	D	B	a	C	D	B	a	C	D
Plan		Run 1				Run 2				Run 3				Run 4				Run 5				Run 6				Run 7			

== Five-day shift plans ==
In four on, one off the employee only gets one day off after a work streak of four days. There are 28 shifts per employee in a five-week cycle (i.e. 35 days). This adds up to an average of 42 hours worked per week with 7½-hour shifts. This plan is mainly adopted by industries in which companies prefers to work for all days of the week, often with four (overlapping) shifts per day, and where laws do not let employees work for 12 hours a day for several days. Five groups of employees are needed to cover a specific shift on all days, where each group gets a different day off.

two on, one off example with 8-hour shift
Time	Week 1							Week 2							Week 3							Week 4							Week 5						
Time	Mon	Tue	Wed	Thu	Fri	Sat	Sun	Mon	Tue	Wed	Thu	Fri	Sat	Sun	Mon	Tue	Wed	Thu	Fri	Sat	Sun	Mon	Tue	Wed	Thu	Fri	Sat	Sun	Mon	Tue	Wed	Thu	Fri	Sat	Sun
08:00–15:30	A	A	A	A	off	A	A	A	A	off	A	A	A	A	off	A	A	A	A	off	A	A	A	A	off	A	A	A	A	off	A	A	A	A	off
08:00–15:30	B	B	B	off	B	B	B	B	off	B	B	B	B	off	B	B	B	B	off	B	B	B	B	off	B	B	B	B	off	B	B	B	B	off	B
08:00–15:30	C	C	off	C	C	C	C	off	C	C	C	C	off	C	C	C	C	off	C	C	C	C	off	C	C	C	C	off	C	C	C	C	off	C	C
08:00–15:30	D	off	D	D	D	D	off	D	D	D	D	off	D	D	D	D	off	D	D	D	D	off	D	D	D	D	off	D	D	D	D	off	D	D	D
08:00–15:30	off	E	E	E	E	off	E	E	E	E	off	E	E	E	E	off	E	E	E	E	off	E	E	E	E	off	E	E	E	E	off	E	E	E	E
Plan	Run 1					Run 2					Run 3					Run 4					Run 5					Run 6					Run 7				

== Six-day shift plans ==
In four on, two off the employee gets two days off. There are 28 shifts per employee in a six-week cycle (i.e. 42 days), this adds up to an average of 56 hours worked per week with 12-hour shifts, or 37 1/3 hours per week with 8-hour shifts. Three groups are needed for each time span, i.e. to cover the whole day and week a company needs 6 groups for 12-hour shifts or 9 groups for 8-hour shifts. This plan is mainly adopted by industries in which employees do not engage in much physical activity.

Four on, two off example with one 8-hour shift per day
Shift	Week 1							Week 2							Week 3							Week 4							Week 5							Week 6						
Shift	Mon	Tue	Wed	Thu	Fri	Sat	Sun	Mon	Tue	Wed	Thu	Fri	Sat	Sun	Mon	Tue	Wed	Thu	Fri	Sat	Sun	Mon	Tue	Wed	Thu	Fri	Sat	Sun	Mon	Tue	Wed	Thu	Fri	Sat	Sun	Mon	Tue	Wed	Thu	Fri	Sat	Sun
07:00–19:00	A	A	A	A	off	off	A	A	A	A	off	off	A	A	A	A	off	off	A	A	A	A	off	off	A	A	A	A	off	off	A	A	A	A	off	off	A	A	A	A	off	off
07:00–19:00	B	B	off	off	B	B	B	B	off	off	B	B	B	B	off	off	B	B	B	B	off	off	B	B	B	B	off	off	B	B	B	B	off	off	B	B	B	B	off	off	B	B
07:00–19:00	off	off	C	C	C	C	off	off	C	C	C	C	off	off	C	C	C	C	off	off	C	C	C	C	off	off	C	C	C	C	off	off	C	C	C	C	off	off	C	C	C	C
Plan	Run 1						Run 2						Run 3						Run 4						Run 5						Run 6						Run 7					

== Week shift plans ==
=== Three-shifts ===
The three-shift system is the most common plan for five 24-hour days per week. The "first shift" often runs from 06:00 to 14:00, "second shift" or "swing shift" from 14:00 to 22:00 and a "third shift" or "night shift" from 22:00 to 06:00, but shifts may also have different length to accommodate for workload, e.g. 7, 8 and 9 or 6, 8 and 10 hours. To provide coverage 24/7, employees have their days off ("weekends") on different days.

All of the shifts have desirable and less desirable qualities. First shift has very early starts, so time in the evening before is heavily cut short. The second shift occupies the times during which many people finish work and socialize. The third shift creates a situation in which the employee must sleep during the day; it may be preferred for night owls, for whom this is a desired sleep pattern.

Three-shift example
Time	Mon	Tue	Wed	Thu	Fri	Sat	Sun
07:30–14:30	A	A	A	A	A	off	off
14:30–22:30	B	B	B	B	B	off	off
22:30–07:30	C	C	C	C	C	off	off

To provide an overlap in shifts, some employers may require one of the shifts to work four 10-hour shifts per week (as opposed to five 8-hour shifts, both are 40 hours per week). In that scenario, the night shift might extend from 21:00 to 07:00, but the night- shift would have nearly four days off (86 hours) between work weeks. This change, along with first shift moving a half-hour later, or second moving a half-hour earlier, ensures at least a half-hour overlap between shifts, which might be desirable if the business is open to the public to ensure that customers continue to be served during a shift change.

Some U.S. states, such as California, accommodate this arrangement by allowing the employee to be paid at their regular rate (as opposed to time-and-a-half, or an overtime rate, that would normally be required for any time past 8 hours) for the 10-hour shift, calling this an "alternative workweek".

=== Four on, three off ===
In four on, three off, each employee works four days and gets a three-day weekend. For some types of manufacturing, this is a win-win arrangement. For example, a paint company had been making 3 batches of paint per day, Sunday through Saturday (3 × 5 = 15). They changed to making 4 batches of paint, Monday through Thursday (4 × 4 = 16). Total worker hours remained the same, but profits increased. In exchange for two additional hours of work per day, over 4 days, workers got an additional day off every week. See also the book, 4 Days, 40 Hours.

Four on, three off example with 10-hour shifts (in comparison to five-day week schemes)
Time		Mon	Tue	Wed	Thu	Fri	Sat	Sun
4-day week	08:00–18:00	10 h	10 h	10 h	10 h	off	off	off
4½-day week	08:00–17:00	9 h	9 h	9 h	9 h	4 h	off	off
5-day week	09:00–17:00	8 h	8 h	8 h	8 h	8 h	off	off

=== Continental plan ===
Continental plan, adopted primarily in central Europe, is a rapidly changing three-shift system that is usually worked for seven days straight, after which employees are given time off, e.g. 3 mornings, 2 afternoons and then 2 nights.

Continental shift example
Time	Mon	Tue	Wed	Thu	Fri	Sat	Sun
06:00–14:00	A	A	A	C	C	B	B
14:00–22:00	B	B	B	A	A	C	C
22:00–06:00	C	C	C	B	B	A	A

=== 24*7 shifts ===
In the 24*7 plan there are 24 consecutive shifts of 7 hours per week, hence covering 24/7. With 4 groups and 6 shifts per group, the work time is 42 hours per week. Several sub-patterns are possible, but usually each group is responsible for one of four time slots per day. Each of these is 6 hours long and if a shift begins in their time slot, a group has to work it. This way there are 14, 21 or 42 hours of rest between shifts, every group gets one whole day off. Shifts can be swapped to make double-shifts and increase the minimum time of rest.

24*7 example with double shifts and long rests around them
Shift/Group	Work time window	Mon	Tue	Wed	Thu	Fri	Sat	Sun
Night	21:00–09:00	21:00–04:00	01:00–08:00	22:00–05:00	off	23:00–13:00	off	00:00–07:00
Morning	03:00–15:00	04:00–11:00	08:00–15:00	05:00–12:00	02:00–09:00	off	03:00–17:00	off
Day	06:00–18:00	off	15:00–22:00	12:00–19:00	09:00–16:00	13:00–20:00	off	07:00–21:00
Evening	15:00–03:00	11:00–01:00	off	19:00–02:00	16:00–23:00	20:00–03:00	17:00–24:00	off

=== Split shift ===
Split shift is used primarily in the catering, transport, hotel, and hospitality industry. Waiters and chefs work for four hours in the morning (to prepare and serve Lunch), then four hours in the evening (for an Evening meal). The average working day of a chef on split shifts could be 10:00 to 14:00 and then 17:00 to 21:00

Split shift example
Shift	Time	Mon	Tue	Wed	Thu	Fri	Sat	Sun
Lunch	10:00–14:00	on	on	on	on	on	off	off
Break	14:00–17:00	off	off	off	off	off	off	off
Dinner	17:00–21:00	on	on	on	on	on	off	off

=== Earlies and lates ===
Earlies and lates is used primarily in industries such as customer service (help desk, phone-support), convenience stores, child care (day nurseries), and other businesses that require coverage greater than the average 09:00 to 17:00 working day in the UK, but no 24/7 coverage either. Employees work in two shifts that largely overlap, such as early shift from 08:00 to 16:00 and late shift from 10:00 to 18:00

Earlies and lates shift example
Shift	Time	Mon	Tue	Wed	Thu	Fri	Sat	Sun
Morning								
Evening								

In businesses where two shifts are necessary to cover the day, earlies and lates may be combined with one double shift per week per worker. Six 7-hour shifts in five days and seven 6-hour shifts in six days both result in 42 hours per week.

Earlies and lates with double shift example, six 7-hour shifts in five days, ten groups
Shift	Time	Mon	Tue	Wed	Thu	Fri	Sat	Sun
Earlies	08:00–15:00	ABCDE F	ABCDE G	ABCDE H	ABCDE I	ABCDE J	Off	Off
Lates	15:00–22:00	A FGHIJ	B FGHIJ	C FGHIJ	D FGHIJ	E FGHIJ	Off	Off

Earlies and lates with double shift example, seven 6-hour shifts in six days, twelve groups
Shift	Time	Mon	Tue	Wed	Thu	Fri	Sat	Sun
Earlies	08:00–14:00	ABCDEF G	ABCDEF H	ABCDEF I	ABCDEF J	ABCDEF K	ABCDEF L	Off
Lates	14:00–20:00	A GHIJKL	B GHIJKL	C GHIJKL	D GHIJKL	E GHIJKL	F GHIJKL	Off

=== 28-hour day ===
The 6-day week with 28 hours per "day" is a general concept for full week coverage where the 168 hours of the week are grouped differently. It can be used as a base for several shift plans, e.g. four 7-hour shifts per day where every employee works six shifts for a total of 42 hours per week.

28-hour day example
Day	1	2	3	4	5	6
Start	Mon 00:00	Tue 04:00	Wed 08:00	Thu 12:00	Fri 16:00	Sat 20:00
1st shift	A	E	C	A	E	C
2nd shift	B	F	D	B	F	D
3rd shift	C	A	E	C	A	E
4th shift	D	B	F	D	B	F

=== 21-hour day ===
The 8-day week with 21 hours per "day" is a general concept for full week coverage where the 168 hours of the week are grouped differently. It can be used as a base for several shift plans, e.g. three 7-hour shifts per day where every employee works six shifts for a total of 42 hours per week, but to get whole days off groups work alternating double shifts.

21-hour day example
Day	1	2	3	4	5	6	7	8
Start	Mon 00:00	Mon 21:00	Tue 18:00	Wed 15:00	Thu 12:00	Fri 09:00	Sat 06:00	Sun 03:00
1st shift	A	D	C	B	A	D	C	B
2nd shift	B	A	D	C	B	A	D	C
3rd shift	C	B	A	D	C	B	A	D

== 8-day shift plans ==
Four on, four off is a shift plan that is being heavily adopted in the United Kingdom and in some parts of the United States. An employee works for four days, usually in 12-hour shifts (7:00 to 7:00) then has four days off. While this creates a "48-hour week" (42-hour average over the year) with long shifts, it may be preferred because it shrinks the work week down to four days, and then gives the employee four days' rest—double the time of a usual weekend. Due to the plan, employees effectively work an eight-day week, and the days they work vary by "week". As with three-shift systems, most employees stay with the same shift rather than cycling through them.

Four on, four off example for two different schedules
four on, four off	ten-fourteen	Week 1							Week 2	
four on, four off	ten-fourteen	Mon	Tue	Wed	Thu	Fri	Sat	Sun	Mon	...
07:00–19:00	08:00–18:00	A	A	A	A	C	C	C	C	...
19:00–07:00	18:00–08:00	B	B	B	B	D	D	D	D	...

A variation of the four on, four off plan is the two days, two nights, four off plan of working, or 2-2-4. Like the previous example it requires four separate teams to maintain 24/7 coverage. The difference is that all employees work both day and night shifts. Usually employees have to work 12-hour shifts from 06:00 to 18:00 on day shifts and from 18:00 to 06:00 on nights. This plan is currently in use in the UK by HM Coastguard and some ambulance services.

Two days, two nights, four off example
Time	Week 1							Week 2	
Time	Mon	Tue	Wed	Thu	Fri	Sat	Sun	Mon	...
06:00–18:00	A	A	B	B	C	C	D	D	...
18:00–06:00	D	D	A	A	B	B	C	C	...

A similar shift pattern is used by fire services such as London Fire Brigade, where the night shifts are longer than the day shifts. This may be referred to as a ten-fourteen roster, if the day shift lasts for ten hours and the night shift lasts fourteen. Extended night shifts such as these are often a double edged sword; on one hand crews on slower weeknight shifts, or those in areas of low demand will receive excellent levels of rest (when there are no calls for emergency services, crews are encouraged to rest if required). Conversely, those employed on high demand days such as weekend nights, or in particularly high demand areas, will often be required to be awake or working for their entire rostered shift. However, due to the scheduled nature, most ambulance and fire employees can attempt to obtain sufficient rest before or after a particularly busy 14-hour night shift.

== 10-day shift plans ==
The 6 on, 4 off plan is commonly used in British police forces. The pattern worked consists of 2 early shifts, 2 late shifts, 2 night shifts and 4 days off. Shifts last 9–10 hours, creating some overlap between the 5 teams.

6 on, 4 off example
Shift	Week 1							Week 2			
Shift	Mon	Tue	Wed	Thu	Fri	Sat	Sun	Mon	Tue	Wed	...
Early	A	A	B	B	C	C	D	D	E	E	...
Late	E	E	A	A	B	B	C	C	D	D	...
Night	D	D	E	E	A	A	B	B	C	C	...

== 12-day shift plans ==
The 6 on, 6 off plan consists of 3 days and 3 nights of work, then 6 days off. These will alternate between other crews, also known as teams, for a full 24/7 operation. The 12-day pattern repeats in a cycle of twelve weeks, i.e. 84 days.

6 on, 6 off example
Shift	Week 1							Week 2					
Shift	Mon	Tue	Wed	Thu	Fri	Sat	Sun	Mon	Tue	Wed	Thu	Fri	...
06:00 to 18:00	A	A	A	B	B	B	C	C	C	D	D	D	...
18:00 to 06:00	D	D	D	A	A	A	B	B	B	C	C	C	...

== Fortnight shift plans ==
=== Panama Schedule ===
The Panama plan follows a 2-2-3 pattern throughout a fortnight, in which shift workers generally are allowed every other Friday, Saturday, and Sunday off, with two additional days off during the week, although this may differ depending on organization and industry. The most common form utilizes four shifts, each working twelve hours, with two shifts generally paired together: A working days and B working nights while C and D are off, and vice versa. It is not uncommon for shifts to rotate between days and nights, most often with six months spent on nights and six on days. This shift is sometimes known as the 2-2-3 or "two, two and three".

Panama schedule example
Shift	Week 1							Week 2						
Shift	Mon	Tue	Wed	Thu	Fri	Sat	Sun	Mon	Tue	Wed	Thu	Fri	Sat	Sun
06:00 to 18:00	A	A	C	C	A	A	A	C	C	A	A	C	C	C
18:00 to 06:00	B	B	D	D	B	B	B	D	D	B	B	D	D	D

=== 7-day fortnight plan ===
In the 7-day fortnight plan or 2-3-2 plan, employees work their allotted hours within 7 days rather than 10 in a fortnight, i.e. fourteen days and nights. Therefore, 41 hours per week equate to 82 hours per fortnight, which is worked in seven days, at 11–12 hours per shift. This shift structure is used in the broadcast television industry, as well as many law enforcement agencies, as well as health care fields such as nursing and clinical laboratories in the US.

7-day fortnight shift example
Shift	Week 1							Week 2						
Shift	Mon	Tue	Wed	Thu	Fri	Sat	Sun	Mon	Tue	Wed	Thu	Fri	Sat	Sun
08:00–20:00	A	A	C	C	C	A	A	C	C	A	A	A	C	C
20:00–08:00	B	B	D	D	D	B	B	D	D	B	B	B	D	D

One of the advantages of using this plan is each shift pair, for example A and B, will get time off on weekends alternatively, because the schedule is fixed and does not drift.

=== 10-day fortnight plan ===
A 10-day fortnight plan uses six shifts. Each shift works for seven days straight for their first week. On their "off week", they can choose three days to come in, to support other non-shifted departments, fill gaps in coverage, or participate in training.

10-day fortnight shift example
Shift	Week 1							Week 2						
Shift	Mon	Tue	Wed	Thu	Fri	Sat	Sun	Mon	Tue	Wed	Thu	Fri	Sat	Sun
00:00–08:00	A	A	A	A	A	A	A	D	D	D	D	D	D	D
08:00–16:00	B	B	B	B	B	B	B	E	E	E	E	E	E	E
16:00–00:00	C	C	C	C	C	C	C	F	F	F	F	F	F	F
	D, E, and F choose 3 shifts to work							A, B, and C choose 3 shifts to work						

=== Five and two ===
The five and two or 3-2-2 plan provides 24/7 coverage using 4 crews and 12-hour shifts over a fortnight. Average hours is 42 per week but contains a 60-hour week which can be challenging.

7-day fortnight shift example
Shift	Week 1							Week 2							Week 3							Week 4						
Shift	Mon	Tue	Wed	Thu	Fri	Sat	Sun	Mon	Tue	Wed	Thu	Fri	Sat	Sun	Mon	Tue	Wed	Thu	Fri	Sat	Sun	Mon	Tue	Wed	Thu	Fri	Sat	Sun
08:00–20:00	D	D	D	B	B	D	D	B	B	B	A	A	B	B	A	A	A	C	C	A	A	C	C	C	B	B	C	C
20:00–08:00	A	A	A	C	C	A	A	C	C	C	D	D	C	C	B	B	B	D	D	B	B	D	D	D	A	A	D	D

=== 5/4/9s ===
5/4/9s or Five/Four Nines is a mix of 5-day and 4-day work weeks. Employees work in two-week cycles. Week 1, the employee works 4 days of 9 hours followed by 1 day of 8 hours with 2 days off (i.e. 44 hours). Week 2, the employee works 4 days of 9 hours with 3 days off (i.e. 36 hours).

Like 8 hours a day for 5 days a week, this plan works to 80-hours in a two-week pay-period. Since employees work on nine days per cycle, this plan is also referred to as 9/80. The benefit to working an extra hour a day gives you a normal 2-day weekend followed by a long 3-day weekend the next. Typical working hours for this type of shift would be 06:00 to 15:30 (9 hours with 30 minutes lunch) and 06:00 to 14:30 (8 hours with 30 minutes lunch) on the 8-hour work day. Often the employer will alter the starting times (e.g., start at 07:00 or 08:00).

5/4/9s shift example
Week	Mon	Tue	Wed	Thu	Fri	Sat	Sun
Week 1	9 h	9 h	9 h	9 h	8 h	off	off
Week 2	9 h	9 h	9 h	9 h	off	off	off

A variation, early weekend or 4½-day week, has the employees work every Friday, but only for 4 hours each. Their weekend thus starts with the Friday lunch break.

== Long-term shift plans ==
=== DuPont 12-hour rotating plan ===
The DuPont 12-hour rotating plan provides 24/7 coverage using four crews and 12-hour shifts while providing a week off. Average hours is 42 per week but contains a 72-hour week which can be challenging. It is used in several manufacturing industries in the US. Companies that have gone to this schedule have noticed a decrease in accidents plus more rest for employees, fewer call ins, and more coverage when crews are short handed. In all the schedule is designed to improve safety. A particular advantage of this plan is that it can readily be slewed to fit business requirements. For example, if less coverage is required on a Sunday, stand-alone shifts are avoided by scheduling the fourth night and first day of four on that day. This also has the additional benefit of the quick turnaround day between three shift days and nights also falling on a Sunday.

DuPont 12-hour rotating shift example
Time	Week 1							Week 2							Week 3							Week 4						
Time	M	T	W	R	F	S	S	M	T	W	R	F	S	S	M	T	W	R	F	S	S	M	T	W	R	F	S	S
07:00–19:00	D	D	D	C	C	C	C	A	A	A	D	D	D	D	B	B	B	A	A	A	A	C	C	C	B	B	B	B
19:00–07:00	A	A	A	A	D	D	D	B	B	B	B	A	A	A	C	C	C	C	B	B	B	D	D	D	D	C	C	C

To balance pay into 36- and 48-hour weeks, many US companies shift the DuPont Schedule so the seven-day rest period ends on Friday night.

DuPont 12-hour rotating shift example 2
Time	Week 1							Week 2							Week 3							Week 4						
Time	M	T	W	R	F	S	S	M	T	W	R	F	S	S	M	T	W	R	F	S	S	M	T	W	R	F	S	S
07:00–19:00	B	B	B	B	D	D	D	C	C	C	C	A	A	A	D	D	D	D	B	B	B	A	A	A	A	C	C	C
19:00–07:00	D	C	C	C	A	A	A	A	D	D	D	B	B	B	B	A	A	A	C	C	C	C	B	B	B	D	D	D

To allow 3 full days off following a shift of nights, the day off between three days and three nights is removed. This example allows for a recovery day after 3 nights before a weekend off and for some workers more appropriately balances work/life.

DuPont 12-hour rotating shift example 3
Time	Week 1							Week 2							Week 3							Week 4						
Time	M	T	W	R	F	S	S	M	T	W	R	F	S	S	M	T	W	R	F	S	S	M	T	W	R	F	S	S
07:00–19:00	B	B	B	B	D	D	D	C	C	C	C	A	A	A	D	D	D	D	B	B	B	A	A	A	A	C	C	C
19:00–07:00	C	C	C	A	A	A	A	D	D	D	B	B	B	B	A	A	A	C	C	C	C	B	B	B	D	D	D	D

=== Seven-day eight-hour rotating plan ===
The seven-day eight-hour rotating plan provides 24/7 coverage using 8-hour shifts with 5 crews. It consists of a "morning shift" from 07:00 to 15:00, a "swing shift" from 15:00 to 22:30 and a "night shift" from 22:30 to 07:30. Each shift works for five days straight. The 8-hour shifts allow vacations and absences to be covered by splitting shifts or working double shifts. The run of day shifts is 56 hours, but the 8-hour shift provides time for some socializing after work.

This plan was once common in the pulp and paper industry in the Western United States but has been largely replaced by an 8 days, 8 swing, 5 nights, 9 off, 8-hour rotation.

7-day 8-hour rotating shift example
Week	Mon	Tue	Wed	Thu	Fri	Sat	Sun
1	Day	Day	Day	Day	Day	off	off
2	Swing	off	off	Swing	Swing	Swing	Swing
3	Night	Night	off	off	Night	Night	Night
4	Day	Day	Day	Day	off	off	Day
5	Swing	Swing	Swing	Swing	Swing	off	off
6	off	Night	Night	Night	Night	Night	off
7	off	off	Day	Day	Day	Day	Day
8	Swing	Swing	Swing	Swing	Swing	off	off
9	Night	off	off	Night	Night	Night	Night
10	Day	Day	off	off	Day	Day	Day
11	Swing	Swing	Swing	off	off	Swing	Swing
12	Night	Night	Night	Night	off	off	Night
13	Day	Day	Day	Day	Day	off	off
14	off	Swing	Swing	Swing	Swing	Swing	off
15	off	off	Night	Night	Night	Night	Night

== Graveyard shift ==
Graveyard shift, night shift, or third shift means a shift of work running through the early hours of the morning, especially shifts starting around midnight. The origin of this phrase is uncertain. According to Michael Quinion it is an "evocative term for the night shift … when … your skin is clammy, there's sand behind your eyeballs, and the world is creepily silent, like the graveyard."

In 2007, the World Health Organization (WHO) announced that working the graveyard shift would be listed as a "probable" cause of cancer.

== On-call ==
Employees who work on an on-call basis have no regular schedule. They agree as a condition of employment to report to work when they are called, 24 hours a day, 7 days a week. This is particularly common in American railroad employment, especially for train crews. Other groups of workers may be on-call from home for some days and working normal shifts for others, or will work during normal business hours and then remain on-call from home for the rest of that night until the following morning (this working pattern is common for senior doctors, for example).

== Firefighting schedules ==
In many North American fire departments, firefighters work 24-hour shifts. They are authorized to sleep in the fire station during the time spent on night shift. Most departments split the 168-hour-long week between 3 or 4 work groups (sometimes referred to as 'shifts' or 'platoon groups'), resulting in a 56- or 42-hour workweek, respectively. Some departments reduce the average workweek by scheduling an extra day off for each firefighter in the work group, frequently reducing a 56-hour workweek to a 48-hour workweek by scheduling a 24-hour "Kelly Day" every three weeks. Departments have many options for scheduling firefighters for coverage. One option is 24 on/48 off, where a firefighter will work 24 hours and have 48 hours off, regardless of the day of the week or the holidays. Often they will be scheduled in an A–B–C pattern. Thus, a firefighter will be assigned to A, B or C shift and work whenever that letter is on the calendar.

Most departments have found that a 24-hour work shift, with opportunistic sleeping between calls for service, is a valid means of avoiding some of the health and cognitive problems associated with shift work.

=== Three-platoon schedules ===
The most basic three-platoon schedule is a straight rotation of 24-hour shifts among three platoon groups. This rotation limits time off to 48 hours in a row, less than 66 hours off in a row most workers get each weekend. Workers on this schedule only get one short weekend off every three weeks. Twenty-four hours off-duty is also the minimum required to completely recover from a period of acute sleep deficit.

24/48 pattern
Week	Mon	Tue	Wed	Thu	Fri	Sat	Sun
Week 1	A	B	C	A	B	C	A
Week 2	B	C	A	B	C	A	B
Week 3	C	A	B	C	A	B	C

Another option is known as a California roll, where some shifts will be close together but allow for several days off. This option gives a 96-hour break every 9th day, which is contiguous to the conventional weekend on two of nine weekends, with a third weekend providing a break that starts on Saturday morning. There is an opportunity to accumulate sleep debt over the three days of work, however this debt should be completely cleared over the four-day break. The nine-day rota that is repeated to fill the calendar.

California roll shift schedule
Week	Time	Mon	Tue	Wed	Thu	Fri	Sat	Sun
Week 1	07:00–07:00	A	B	A	C	A	C	B
Week 2	07:00–07:00	C	B					

A firefighter will work 24 hours on, 24 off, 24 on, 24 off, 24 on, 96 hours (4 days) off.

This rotation reduces the chronic sleep deficit accrued over the first two work days at the expense of a shorter long break. This schedule's long break coincides with a standard weekend exactly once every nine weeks. The four-day break could be retained by working a fourth day in the rotation.

Modified California Roll
Week	Time	Mon	Tue	Wed	Thu	Fri	Sat	Sun
Week 1	07:00–07:00	A	B	A	B	C	A	C
Week 2	07:00–07:00	A	B	C	B	C		

A firefighter will work one day, off one, work one, off two, work one, off four days.

A number of departments have investigated further work consolidation by allowing for a 48-hour work shift. Careful demand management would be required to avoid acute sleep deficit, however, firefighters should return to work fully recovered from the previous shift.

Kenneth B. Ellerbe chief of the District of Columbia Fire and Emergency Medical Services Department has proposed a schedule where firefighters work three-day shifts, followed by three night shifts, followed by three days off. It is likely that such a schedule would impact all four alertness factors associated with shift work, and result in a threat to public safety. It would result in exactly one break coinciding with the standard weekend every nine weeks.

=== Four-platoon schedules ===
The most basic four-platoon schedule is a straight rotation of 24-hour work shifts between four work groups or platoons. This schedule works 48 hours per week for three weeks and 24 hours the fourth week, averaging 42 hours per week.

24/72 pattern
Week	Mon	Tue	Wed	Thu	Fri	Sat	Sun
Week 1	A	B	C	D	A	B	C
Week 2	D	A	B	C	D	A	B
Week 3	C	D	A	B	C	D	A
Week 4	B	C	D	A	B	C	D

Another variation of the 24-hour shift schedule is a 4-platoon system, averaging 42 hours/week. Thus, the schedule is 24 on, 48 off, 24 on, 96 off, on a 4-day rotation.

24/48/24/96 pattern
Week	Mon	Tue	Wed	Thu	Fri	Sat	Sun
Week 1	A	D	B	A	C	B	D
Week 2	C	A	D	B	A	C	B
Week 3	D	C	A	D	B	A	C
Week 4	B	D	C	A	D	B	A
Week 5	C	B	D	C	A	D	B
Week 6	A	C	B	D	C	A	D
Week 7	B	A	C	B	D	C	A

=== Split day and night shifts ===
In other fire departments, firefighters work shorter shifts, such as a mix of 10-hour day shifts and 14-hour night shifts. The advantage is that firefighters have shorter working hours. The disadvantage is that they may sometimes have only 12 hours to recover between one night shift and the next. The 2005 Canadian Firefighter study comparing two models with 24-hour shifts with three models requiring at least three consecutive night shifts, found that consecutive nights were shown to be more deleterious to performance than a single, long shift. Performance effectiveness 75% after two consecutive nights and lower after three, compared to 78% for a 24-hour shift. If the schedule induces sleep deficit in a subsequent day shift, this performance would be worse.

On the 2-2-4 schedule, firefighters work two 10-hour days, two 14-hour nights, and then have four days off. This schedule's long break aligns with the conventional weekend for exactly two weeks out of eight. The majority of Australian fire brigades use this schedule (which is locally referred to as the '10/14' or '4 on, 4 off' roster)

The rota is: DDNNOOOO.

The 2-2-3 schedule is also known as the Panama Schedule, however, when firefighters work it, the shifts rotate from day to night between every break. Since the firefighters have a two-day break before any nights worked, they do not start the series of nights with an employment-related sleep deficit. They do work three nights in a row, which would result in chronic sleep deficit if alarms are received on each night, however, the third night is always a Sunday night, which is often less busy than other nights of the week. This schedule allows for a long break every other weekend.

The rota is: DDOONNN OODDOOO NNOODDD OONNOOO

== See also ==
- Eight-hour day
- Soviet calendar, which first used 5-day and later 6-day plans
- Split shift
- Gantt chart
- On call shift
