= Andrew Skene =

Scottish advocate

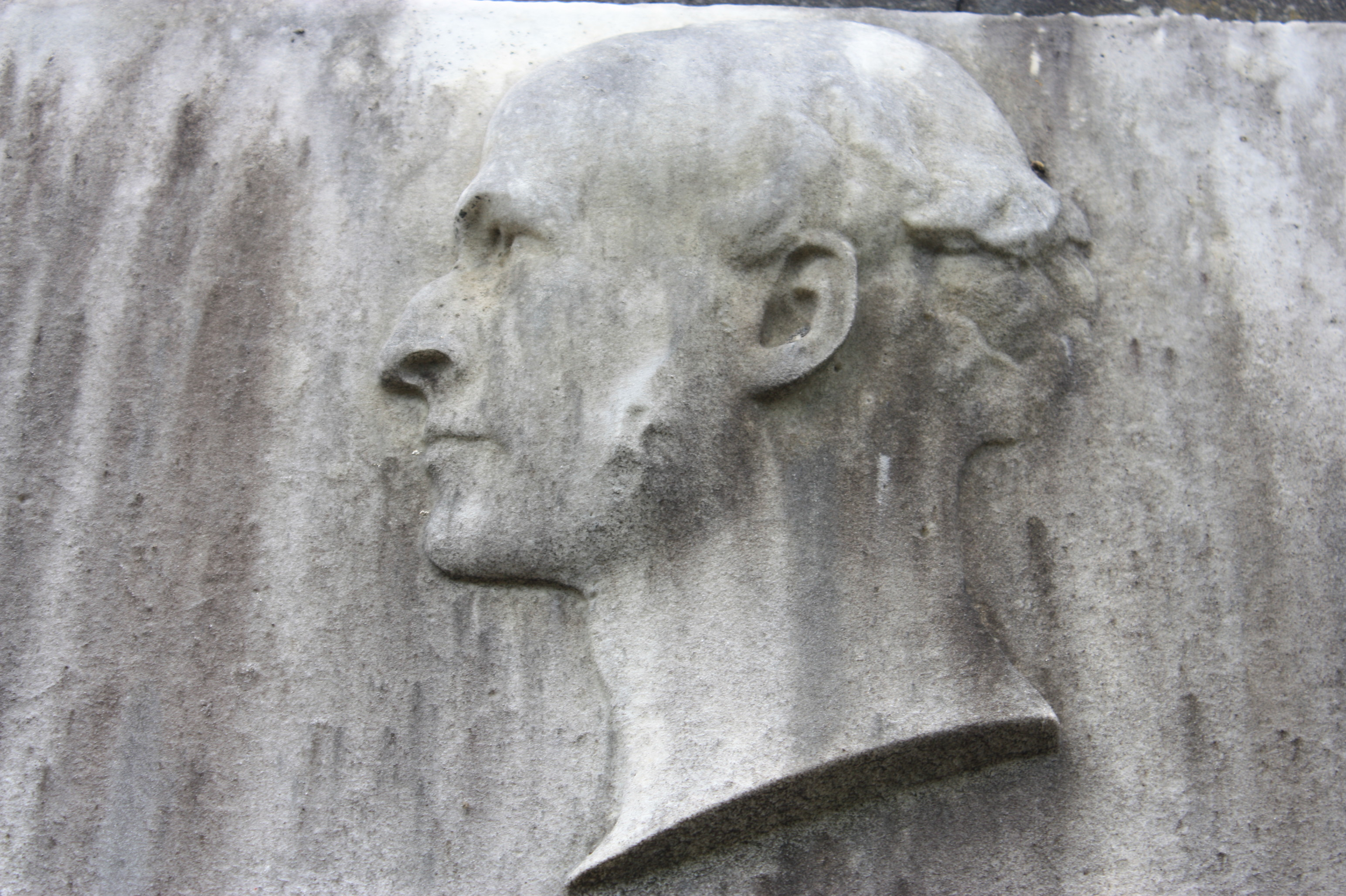
Andrew Skene by Patric Park

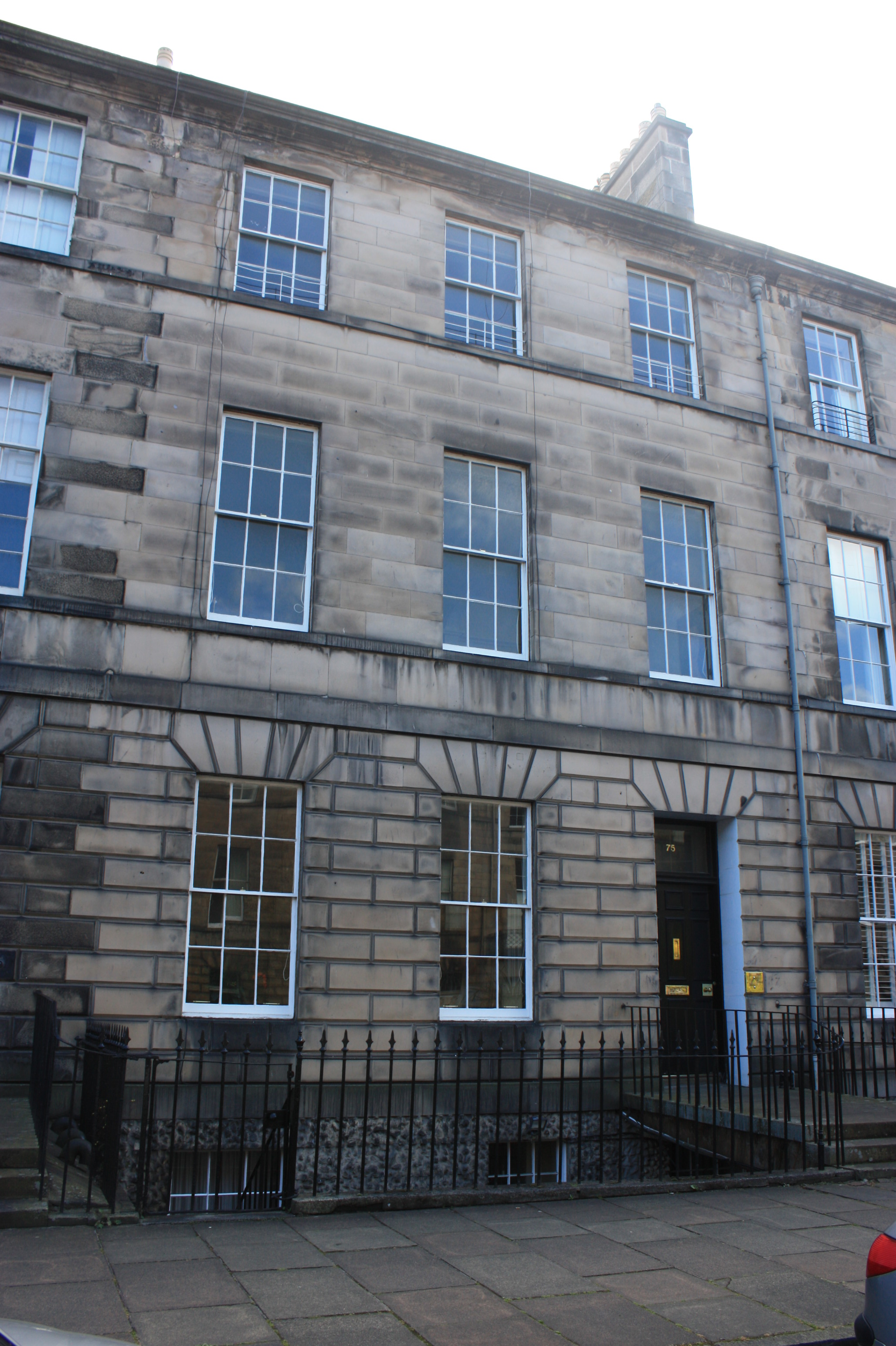
Skene's home at 75 Great King Street, Edinburgh

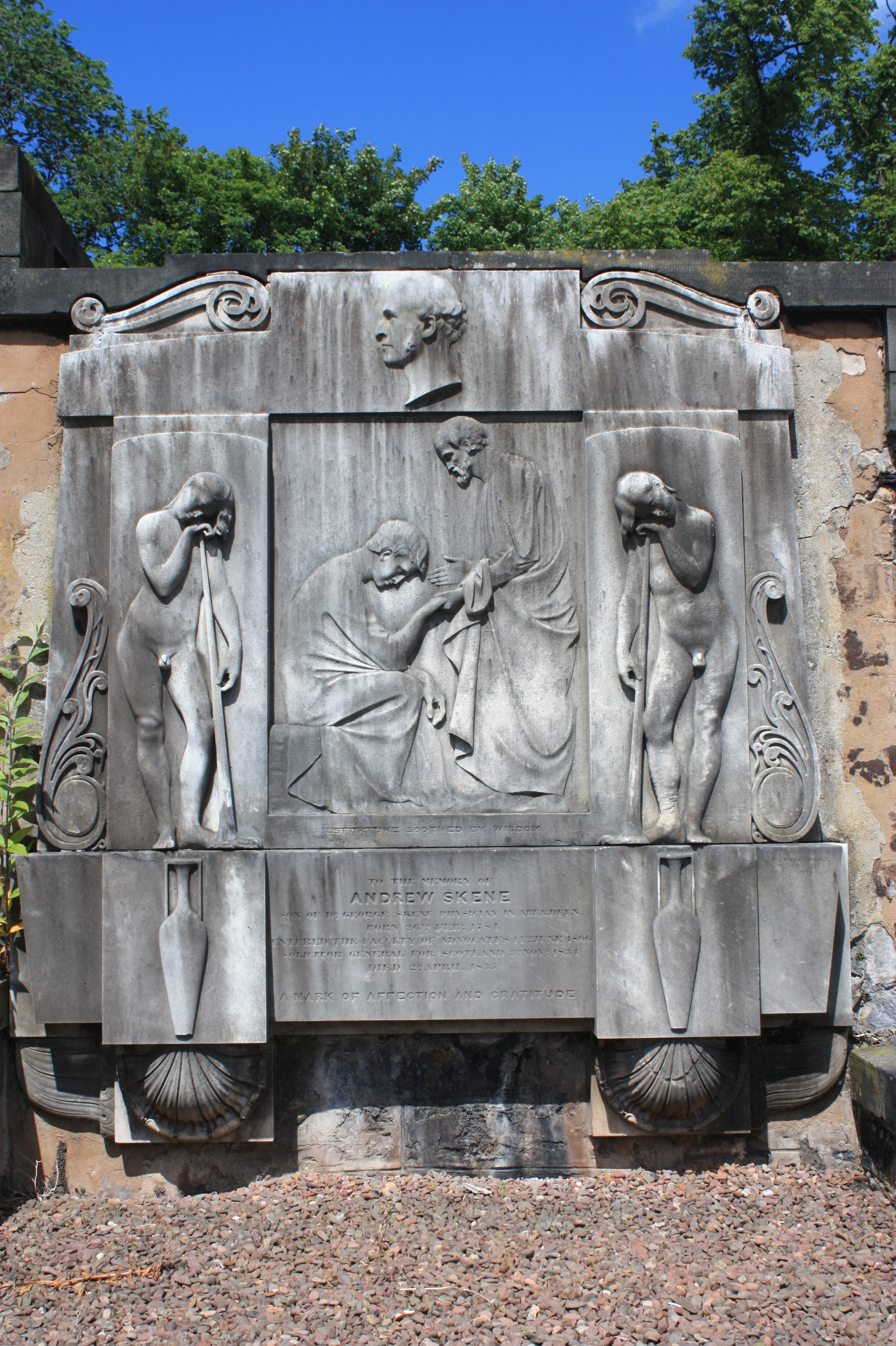
Andrew Skene's grave, New Calton Burial Ground

Andrew Skene FRSE (1784–1835) was a Scottish advocate who rose to the highest level for his profession: Solicitor General for Scotland.

== Life ==
He was born in Aberdeen on 28 February 1784 the son of Prof George Skene of Rubislaw FRSE MD (1741-1803), Professor of Natural Philosophy at Marischal College and Jane Moir of Stoneywood.

In 1811 he was appointed Counsel for the City of Aberdeen in place of John Burnett Judge Admiral, for all legal matters in Scotland.

In 1823 he was a co-founder of the Bannatyne Club along with his brother-in-law Sir Henry Jardine and Sir Walter Scott.

In 1829 he was elected a Fellow of the Royal Society of Edinburgh his proposer being Alexander Maconochie, Lord Meadowbank. He was elected Solicitor General for Scotland in 1834, replacing Henry Cockburn, Lord Cockburn.

He lived at 74 Great King Street in Edinburgh's Second New Town and died there on 2 April 1835, aged only 51. He is buried in New Calton Burial Ground on the east side of the city centre. The extremely fine marble monument was sculpted by Patric Park.

== Family ==
There is sometimes confusion over the family of Andrew Skene and that of James Skene of Rubislaw.

James Skene was the youngest surviving child of George Skene of Rubislaw (1736-1776), an Aberdeenshire landowner and erstwhile lawyer, and Jean Skene (née Moir of Stoneywood) (1741-1820). They had seven children:

Margaret (born 1767), Helen (1768-1841), Catherine (1769-1838) who married Henry Jardine the, King's Remembrancer, George (1770-1791), and James (1775-1864) who inherited his father's estate at Rubislaw. Two daughters, Jean and Maria, did not survive infancy.

As a widow, Jean Skene moved to Edinburgh c. 1783 with her five remaining children. They lived at various addresses including Riddell's Court in the Old Town and George Street and South Castle Street in the New Town., Andrew Skene never married.

== Artistic recognition ==
He was painted by Colvin Smith in 1835 during his role as Solicitor General. The painting is held by the National Gallery of Scotland.
