= Bannatyne Club =

Scottish literary society

The Bannatyne Club, named in honour of George Bannatyne and his famous anthology of Scots literature the Bannatyne Manuscript, was a text publication society founded by Sir Walter Scott to print rare works of Scottish interest, whether in history, poetry, or general literature. The club was established in 1823 and printed 116 volumes before being dissolved in 1861.

== Membership ==
Membership in the Bannatyne Club was much more diverse than that found in more elite clubs such as the Roxburghe Club, including members from the publishing and printing trades in addition to lawyers. While the club was still elite, contributions by amateurs was considered valuable. This made the Bannaytne club a transitional organization between the elitism of previous clubs and the open policy of its successors. Like many Gentlemen's club's of the 18th and 19th centuries, the Bannatyne Club allowed members engage in homosocial relations. For its members, the club served to emphasize Scotland's distinct identity by publishing literary and historical texts. Between 1823 and 1827, membership expanded rapidly, increasing from thirty-one to one hundred members. Members were required to contribute five guineas each year as a membership fee.

== Members ==
=== Founder members of February 7, 1823 ===
- Sir Walter Scott
- Thomas Thomson
- Thomas Kinnear
- David Laing
- William Adam of Blair Adam
- Sir William Arbuthnot, 1st Baronet
- James Ballantyne
- William Bannatyne, Lord Bannatyne
- Robert Bell
- John Clerk, Lord Eldin
- Henry Cockburn, Lord Cockburn
- Archibald Constable
- David Constable
- Robert Dundas of Arniston
- Robert Graham of Balgowan
- Henry Jardine of Harwood
- Rev. John Lee
- James Maidment
- Gilbert Laing Meason
- John Murray, Lord Murray
- Robert Pitcairn
- Sir Samuel Shepherd
- James Skene of Rubislaw
- George Smythe
- Patrick Fraser Tytler (1823)

=== Further Members admitted November 25, 1823 ===
- Gilbert Elliot-Murray-Kynynmound, 2nd Earl of Minto
- George Chalmers
- William Blair of Avonton
- James T. Gibson Craig
- Andrew Skene
- Thomas Maitland, Lord Dundrennan

=== Later members ===
- George Hamilton-Gordon, 4th Earl of Aberdeen (1827)
- Alexander Hamilton, 10th Duke of Hamilton (1828)
- Earl of Ashburnham
- John Russell, 6th Duke of Bedford
- Henry Vassall-Fox, 3rd Baron Holland
- Cosmo Innes
- Rev John Jamieson (1827)
- Robert Pitcairn

=== February 1859 ===
- The Earl of Aberdeen
- William Patrick Adam, Esq
- The Earl of Ashburnham
- Lord Belhaven and Hamilton
- William Blair
- Beriah Botfield, Esq., MP
- Marquess of Breadalban
- Sir Thomas MakDougall Brisbane
- George Brodie, Esq
- Charles Dashwood Bruce, Esq
- Duke of Buccleuch and Queensberry
- Dean Richard Butler
- Sir Hugh Hume Campbell
- James Campbell, Esq
- Thomas Carnegy, Esq
- Earl of Cawdor
- Patrick Chalmers, Esq
- Right Hon. Sir George Clerk
- David Constable, Esq
- Thomas Constable, Esq
- Andrew Coventry, Esq
- David Cowan, Esq
- James T. Gibson Craig, Esq (Treasurer)
- Sir William Gibson Craig
- Marquess of Dalhousie
- George Home Drummond, Esq
- Henry Drummond, Esq, MP
- Right Hon. Sir David Dundas
- George Dundas, Esq.
- William Pitt Dundas, Esq
- Earl of Ellesmere
- Joseph Walter King Eyton, Esq
- Lieut.-Col. Robert Ferguson, MP
- Count Mercer De Flahault
- Earl of Gosford
- William Gott, Esq
- Robert Graham, Esq
- Earl of Haddington
- Duke of Hamilton and Brandon
- Sir Thomas Buchan Hepburn
- James Maitland Hog, Esq
- Right Hon. John Hope, Lord Justice-Clerk
- Cosmo Innes, Esq
- Daved Iriving, LL.D
- Hon. James Ivory, Lord Ivory
- David Laing, Esq (Secretary)
- John Bailey Langhorne, Esq
- The Earl of Lauderdale
- Very Rev. Principal John Lee, DD
- Lord Lindsay
- James Loch, Esq
- The Marquess of Lothian
- Lord Lovat
- James MacKenzie, Esq
- John Whiteford MacKenzie, Esq
- Keith Stewart MacKenzie, Esq
- William Forbes MacKenzie, Esq
- James Maidment, Esq
- Sir William Maxwell, Bart
- The Hon. William Leslie Melville
- The Earl of Minto
- James Moncreiff, Esq., MP
- The Earl of Morton
- James Patrick Muirhead, Esq
- Hon. Sir John A. Murray, Lord Murray
- Robert Nasmyth, Esq
- Hon. Charles Neaves
- Lord Neaves
- The Earl of Northesk
- Lord Panmure
- Alexander Pringle, Esq
- John Richardson, Esq
- Duke of Roxburghe
- Reverend Hew Scott
- James R. Hope Scott, Esq
- Earl of Selkirk
- James Young Simpson, MD
- Alexander Sinclair, Esq
- James Skene, Esq
- William Smythe, Esq
- John Spottiswoode, Esq
- Edward Stanley, Esq
- Reverend William Stevenson, DD
- Hon. Charles Francis Stuart
- Duke of Sutherland
- Archibald Campbell Swinton, Esq
- Alexander Thomson, Esq
- Sir Walter Calverley Trevelyan
- William B. D. D. Turnbull, Esq.
- Adam Urquart, Esq
- Alexander Maconochie Welwood, Esq.

== Publications ==
Full texts of the complete Bannatyne Club publications are available online through the National Library of Scotland.

- Memoirs touching the Revolution in Scotland, originally published 1714, Colin Lindsay, 3rd Earl of Balcarres (1841)
- The Bannatyne Miscellany; Containing Original Papers and Tracts Chiefly Relating to the History and Literature of Scotland [Published in Edinburgh] (1827)
- Melville of Halhill, Sir James, Memoirs of His Own Life, ed. T. Thomson (1827)
- Laing, D. ed., Original Letters relating to the Ecclesiastical Affairs of Scotland, 2 vols (Published in Edinburgh, 1851)
- Siege of the Castle of Edinburgh MDCLXXXIX, presented to the Bannatyne Club by Robert Bell (1828)
- The Æneid of Virgil Translated into Scottish Verse by Gavin Douglas, Bishop of Dunkeld, 2 vols. (1839)
