= James Henry Skene =

Writer, traveller, and British Consul at Aleppo

James Henry Skene (3 May 1812 – 3 October 1886) was a writer, traveller and British Consul at Aleppo from March 1855 to 1880.

He was born at Inverie, Scotland, the third son of James Skene of Rubislaw, near Aberdeen. His brothers included the writer William Forbes Skene and his sisters the writer Felicia Mary Frances Skene.

He was educated at the Edinburgh Academy and then joined the army. After serving some years in the 73rd Regiment of Foot, he sold his commission, and settled in Greece, where he married in 1832 and began to write.

In 1853 he published Anadol: the Last Home of the Faithful and The Frontier Lands of the Christian and the Turk, Comprising Travel in the Regions of the Lower Danube in 1850 and 1851.

For his services with the staff of the Army during the Crimean War, he was appointed British vice-consul in Istanbul, Ottoman Empire, and in 1855 was appointed British Consul-General at Aleppo, a position he held until 1880.

When he returned to Edinburgh from Syria in 1880 he brought back with him a colony of Syrian hamsters. This colony died out by 1910.

James Henry Skene's wife Rhalou was the sister of Alexandros Rizos Rangavis (also known as Alexandre Rhangabé), the Greek author and statesman. Their daughter Zoë married William Thomson, who became Archbishop of York.

Skene died in Geneva on 3 October 1886.

== Bibliography ==
- Anadol; the last home of the faithful
- The Danubian principalities, the frontier lands of the Christian and the Turk
- The three eras of Ottoman history, a political essay on the late reforms of Turkey, considered principally as affecting her position in the event of a war taking place
- With Lord Stratford in the Crimean war
