= James Skene =

Scottish lawyer and artist (1775–1864)

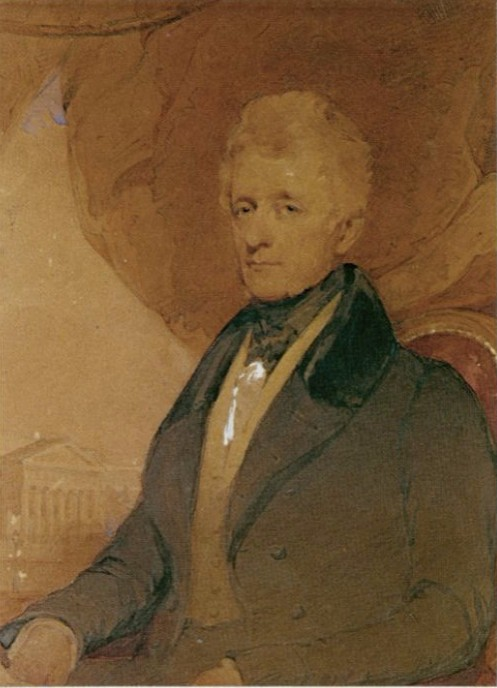
- James Skene (circa 1840)
- Born: 7 March 1775; Rubislaw, Scotland
- Died: 27 November 1864 (aged 89); Oxford, England

James Skene of Rubislaw FSA Scot FRSE FGS (1775–1864) was a Scottish lawyer and amateur artist, best known as a friend of Sir Walter Scott.

== Life ==
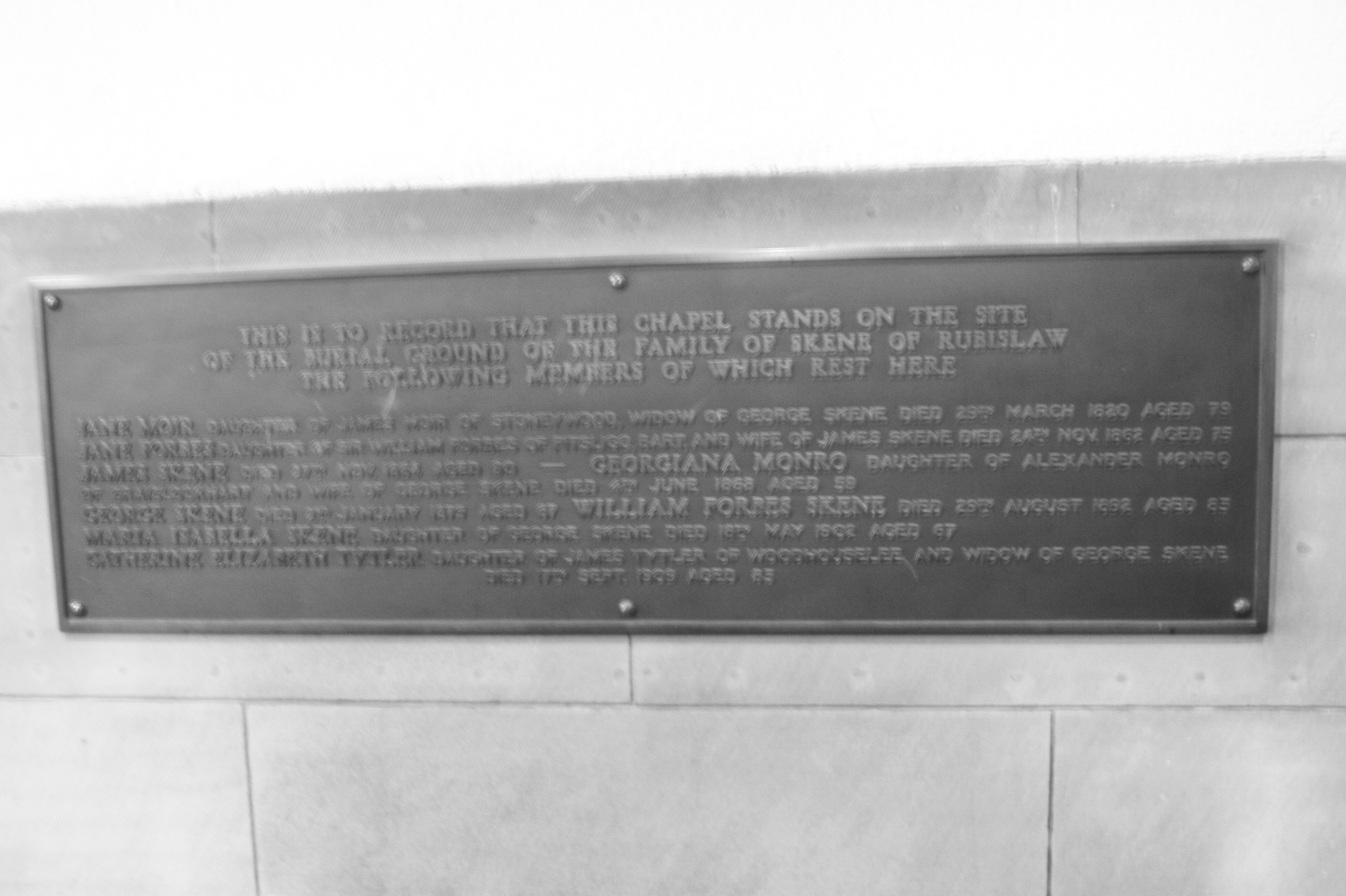
Memorial plaque to the Skene family graves, St John's, Edinburgh

The second son of George Skene (1736–1776) of Rubislaw, Aberdeen, and his wife Jane (Jean) Moir of Stoneywood, he was born at Rubislaw on 7 March 1775. In 1783 Jane, George Skene’s widow, moved to Edinburgh for the education of her seven children.

James Skene attended Edinburgh high school. An elder brother died in 1791, and James became heir of Rubislaw. At 21 he went to Germany as a student, and, returning to Edinburgh, was admitted to the Scottish bar as an advocate in 1797. His friendship with Sir Walter Scott was built on his knowledge of German literature. In 1797 Skene became cornet of the Edinburgh Light Horse, the regiment largely organised by Scott, who was himself its quartermaster, secretary, and paymaster.

In 1802 Skene revisited the continent of Europe, for a time in company with George Bellas Greenough; and he became a member of the Geological Society. Returning to Edinburgh in 1816, he joined literary and scientific societies. On his return he lived with his brother Andrew Skene at 22 Duke Street (renamed and renumbered in the 20th century and now Dublin Street) in the Second New Town.

In 1817 he was elected a Fellow of the Royal Society of Edinburgh. His proposers were Sir George Steuart Mackenzie, Thomas Charles Hope, and Sir David Brewster. From 1820 to 1834 he was the Curator of its library and museum. He was active in the Scottish Society of Antiquaries. He was secretary to the Institution for the Encouragement of the Fine Arts in Scotland.

By 1820 he left his brother's house and obtained a house at 126 Princes Street facing Edinburgh Castle. By this stage he was also actively practising as an advocate. By 1830 he was living in a magnificent house at 46 Moray Place on the Moray Estate in west Edinburgh.

For the health of his family, Skene went to Greece in 1838, staying for several years near Athens, in a villa built to his own design. Returning in 1844, he lived first at Leamington Spa and then at Frewen Hall, Oxford, where he died on 27 November 1864.

== Works and legacy ==
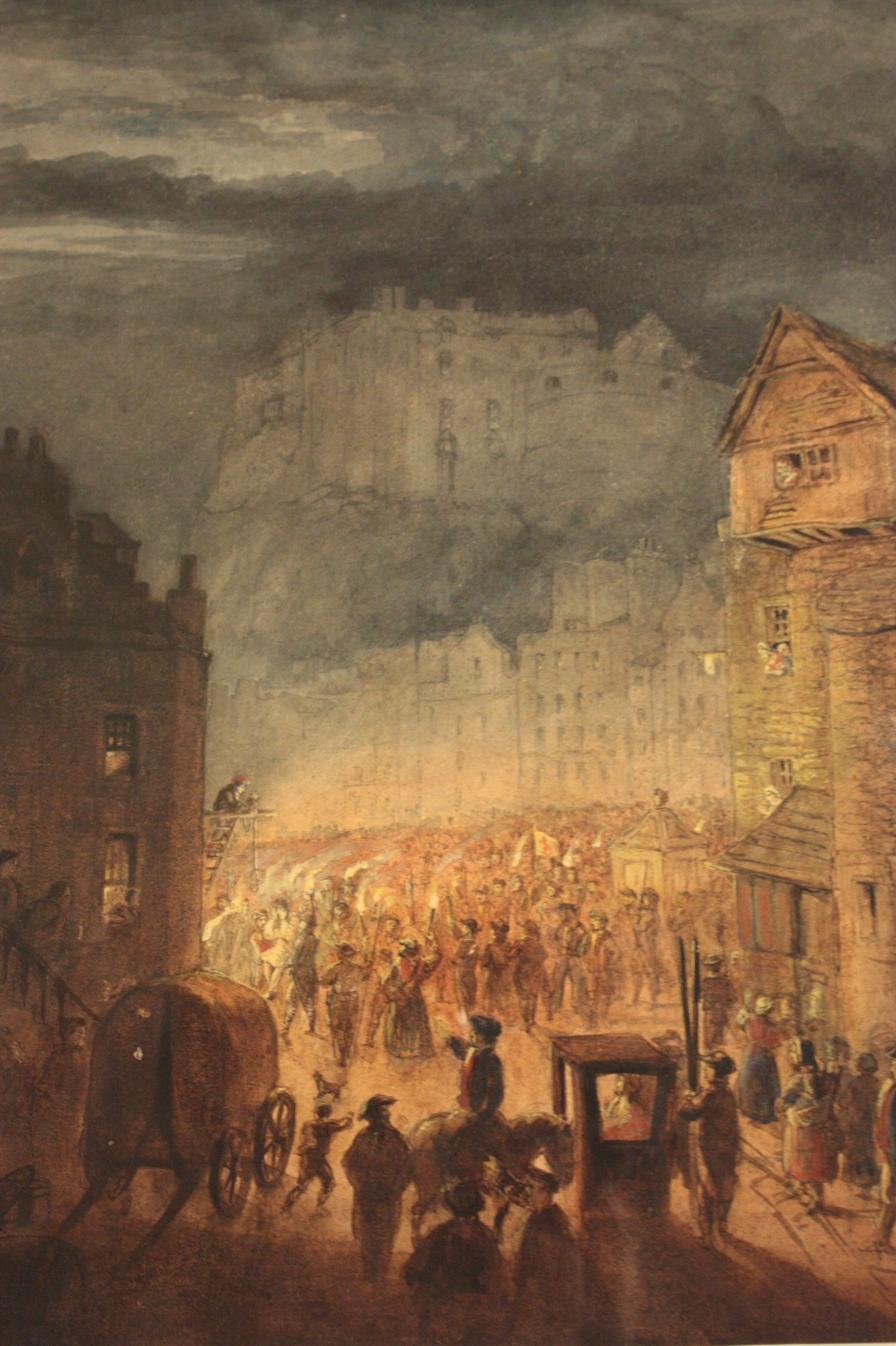
The Porteous Riot by James Skene

Around 1810 Skene led an excavation of the Wellhouse Tower (aka St Margarets Well) on the south edge of the Nor Loch, under Edinburgh Castle. This found an infilled passageway leading under the Castle Rock leading to a cave 7m wide, which then seemed to lead inside the castle. They also found evidence of steps on the outer rock face, leading up to a small platform known as Wallace's Cradle, held a crane, to fetch water to the castle from the wellhouse.

Skene produced A Series of Sketches of the existing Localities alluded to in the Waverley Novels, etched from his own drawings (Edinburgh, 1829). He wrote for the Transactions of societies to which he belonged, and edited John Spalding's History of the Troubles in Scotland for the Bannatyne Club (1828). He wrote the article "Painting" in the Edinburgh Encyclopædia. Full-page illustrations in The Memorials of Skene of Skene are from his drawings.

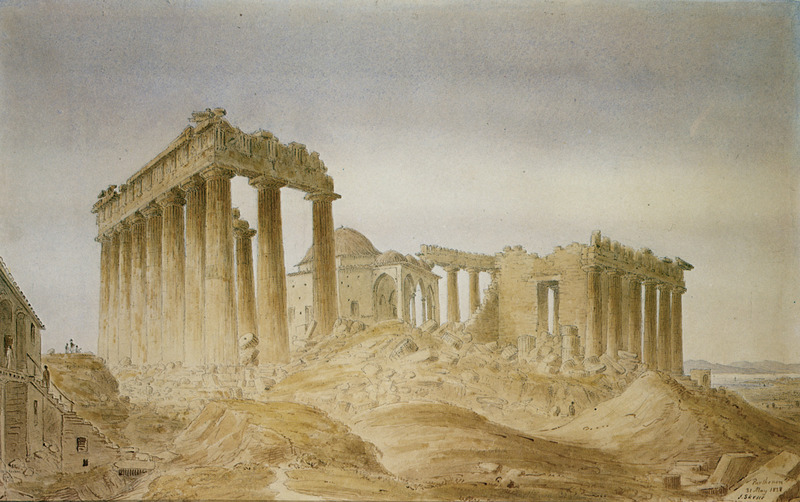
The Parthenon from the northeast (1838–1845)

Skene as a watercolourist was prolific, painting landscapes and antiquities. He is said to have left over 500 watercolour drawings of Greece.

He kept in close contact with Sir Walter Scott: the original introduction to Quentin Durward was inspired by Skene's knowledge of France, from a visit in 1822, and the Jewish theme in Ivanhoe was at least partly his suggestion. John Gibson Lockhart, in his biography of Scott, drew heavily on Skene's manuscripts.

== Family ==
James's sister, Helen Skene, never married and died on 20 July 1842, age 75, in Florence where she is buried in the English Cemetery, Florence. His younger brothers included Andrew Skene. His sister Catherine Skene married Henry Jardine in Edinburgh. Their daughter Catherine Jardine married a Dr Kissock in Edinburgh, and their daughter, Janet Jardine Kissock, is buried in the Protestant Cemetery, Rome.

In 1806 Skene married Jane Forbes (1787–1862), youngest child of Sir William Forbes, 6th Baronet of Pitsligo (her brother William, the seventh Baronet, married, in 1797, Sir Walter Scott's first love, Williamina Stuart). Jane Skene was praised by Scott, who wrote in hisJournal, i. 75, that she was "a most excellent person". The surviving family of the couple consisted of three sons and four daughters.

The first son George Skene (1807–1875) was an advocate and Glasgow University professor and the second son William Forbes Skene. James Hay Skene (1812–1886) (or James Henry Skene) the author was the third son. His wife Rhalou was the sister of Alexandros Rizos Rangavis, the surname appearing in other forms such as Rhangabé.

The eldest daughter Eliza (1810–1886) married Charles de Heidenstam (sv:Carl Peter von Heidenstam) at Athens in 1840; the second daughter Catherine (born 1815) married John Foster Grierson. Another daughter, Caroline, married Alexandros Rizos Rangavis. Felicia Mary Frances Skene, the religious writer, was the fourth daughter.
