= Beinn Dearg =

Beinn Dearg, meaning "Red Mountain" in Gaelic, is the name of several hills in Scotland:

- Beinn Dearg (Ullapool), a 1,084 m (3,556 ft) Munro and Marilyn lying southeast of Ullapool
- Beinn Dearg (Blair Atholl), a 1,009 m (3,310 ft) Munro and Marilyn to the north of Blair Atholl
- Beinn Dearg (Torridon), a 914 m (2,999 ft) Corbett and Marilyn in the Torridon area
- Beinn Dearg (Glen Lyon), a 830 m (2,720 ft) Corbett and Marilyn north of Glen Lyon
- Beinn Dearg (Glenartney), a 706 m (2,316 ft) Graham and Marilyn in the Glenartney area, Perthshire
- Beinn Dearg (Skye), a 552 m (1,811 ft) Marilyn whose parent is The Storr
- Beinn Dearg (Menteith), a 427 m (1,401 ft) Marilyn in the Menteith Hills, the Trossachs
- Beinn Dearg (Cape Wrath), a 423.8 m (1,390 ft) Marilyn in the Cape Wrath peninsula
