= Debra J. Skene =

South African chronobiologist

Debra Jean Skene
- Born: Cape Town, West Cape
- Education: Rhodes University
- Awards: Royal Society Wolfson Research Merit Award
- Scientific career
- Fields: Chronobiology, Circadian Rhythms
- Workplaces: University of Surrey

Dr. Debra J. Skene is a chronobiologist with specific interest in the mammalian circadian rhythm and the consequences of disturbing the circadian system. She is also interested in finding their potential treatments for people who suffer from circadian misalignment. Skene and her team of researchers tackle these questions using animal models, clinical trials, and most recently, liquid chromatography-mass spectrometry. Most notably, Skene is credited for her evidence of a novel photopigment in humans, later discovered to be melanopsin. She was also involved in discovering links between human PER3 genotype and an extremely shifted sleep schedules categorized as extreme diurnal preference. Skene received her Bachelor of Pharmacy, Master of Science, and Ph.D. in South Africa.

== Academic career ==
=== Employment and affiliations ===
| Organization/Institution | Position | Start date | Stop Date |
|---|---|---|---|
| European Biological Rhythms Society | Secretary | 2002 | 2009 |
| European Biological Rhythms Society | Treasurer | 2002 | 2009 |
| European Biological Rhythms Society | Vice President | 2012 | 2015 |
| European Biological Rhythms Society | President | 2012 | 2019 |
| 2012 Gordon Research Conference | Pineal Cell Biology Chair | 2012 | 2012 |
| European Sleep Research Society | Vice President | 2010 | 2014 |
| Journal of Sleep Research | Associate Editor | Current | |
| Chronobiology International | Editorial Board | Current | |
| Stockgrand Ltd and Surrey Assays Ltd. | Co-Director | | |

=== Faculty positions and awards ===
Skene is a professor of neuroendocrinology at the University of Surrey in the United Kingdom. She has been conducting research in the field of chronobiology for over 25 years and has published over 150 papers. She is also a past Royal Society Wolfson Research Merit Award Holder. This award is granted to UK-based scientists with outstanding achievement in their field, provides an enhancement to their current salary, and is funded by both the Wolfson Foundation and the Royal Society. She was elected a Fellow of the Academy of Medical Sciences in 2024.

| Institution | Position | Start date | Stop Date |
|---|---|---|---|
| Medical University of Southern Africa | Lecturer in Pharmacology | January 1980 | April 1984 |
| Université Louis Pasteur | Research Associate | January 1990 | December 1991 |
| University of Surrey | Research Officer | August 1984 | August 1989 |
| University of Surrey | Lecturer in Physiology | January 1992 | March 1997 |
| University of Surrey | Senior Lecturer in Physiology | April 1997 | March 1999 |
| University of Surrey | Reader in Neuroendocrinology | April 1999 | March 2002 |
| University of Surrey | Professor of Neurodocrinology | April 2002 | Current |

== Scientific achievements ==
=== Potentials of melatonin in detecting and treating circadian associated disorders ===
In late 1980s, Skene and her team tracked the parameters of melatonin synthesis pattern in the pineal gland of Syrian hamsters under different photoperiod. Since then, Skene and her team have been studying both melatonin synthesis patterns in various diseases, and ways that melatonin can be used reset and alleviate symptoms of disrupted circadian clock experienced in jetlag, night shifts, blindness, as well as in neurodegenerative diseases. These symptoms of disrupted circadian clock include fatigue, sleepiness, insomnia, difficulty waking up, and cognitive and metabolic problems. In the early 2000s, her team discovered that administering melatonin can entrain the circadian clock that is normally free-running in totally blind people. Around the same tine, her team also began researching how aging and neurodegenerative disorders such as Alzheimer's disease affect melatonin synthesis, and the link between disrupted melatonin synthesis and sleep disorders AD patients experience in early stages of the disease. In the early 2010s, her team performed a meta-analysis on the efficacy of melatonin in treating various sleep disorders. They concluded that melatonin treatment is effective in reducing sleep latency and improves overall sleep quality in certain types of adult sleep disorders.

=== Effects of short wavelength light ===
In 2001, Skene published a paper demonstrating the presence of a novel photopigment, outside of the traditional rods and cones, sensitive to short-wavelength light suppression of circadian melatonin secretion in humans. Later, it was found that this novel photopigment, melanopsin, plays an important role in non-visual responses to light within the human body and is present in a distinct class of photoreceptor cells called intrinsically photosensitive retinal ganglion cells (ipRGCs). Her subsequent research has demonstrated that phase advances in circadian melatonin rhythm occur when short wavelength light is presented at very low intensities in the morning, with similar phase advances being observed for white light presented at 185x greater intensity, indicating a special sensitivity of the human circadian system to short wavelength light. Further, her team has found that this suppression of melatonin by short wavelength light is less effective in older, postmenopausal women when compared to younger, premenopausal women. Overall Skene's findings have played a role in prompting further research in the optimal use of light as a therapeutic agent in sleep related and circadian disorders.

=== Clinical correlates of human PER3 polymorphisms ===
The human PER3 gene is an important part of the mechanism for maintaining autonomous oscillations of the molecular circadian clock. In 2003, Skene’s team demonstrated the first connection between the number of variable number tandem repeat polymorphisms in the human PER3 gene with extreme diurnal preference also known as extreme morningness or eveningness. Homozygous alleles with short polymorphisms having 4 repeat sequences were associated with delayed sleep phase syndrome (DSPS), while 5 repeat sequences were shown to be associated more with advanced sleep period. Additionally, these same polymorphisms have been implicated in sleep homeostasis by Skene’s later research. Individuals homozygous for the 5 repeat PER3 allele showed increased slow wave sleep, greater ability to fall asleep or stay asleep, and suffered more on cognitive tests following sleep deprivation than people with the homozygous 4 repeat genotype. Taken together, Skene’s findings have important implications for how a person’s PER3 genotype can affect how they tolerate the effects of shift work.

=== Therapeutic potentials of light therapy in treating circadian and related disorders ===
In the early 2000s, Skene and her team found that many human circadian variables such as the timing of melatonin synthesis, body temperature and heart rate are responsive to blue-enriched light, and that blue-enriched light is more effective in reducing subjective sleepiness and improving alertness, compared to other wavelength lights. Since people who work night shifts often suffer from fatigue, Skene and her team have sought to improve the cognitive and metabolic symptoms night shifts workers experience due to their disrupted circadian rhythm. Recently, her team found that blue-enriched white light improved performance in stimulated night shift conditions. Her team also tested whether exercise could help stabilize non-behavioral indicator of circadian rhythm, but found that low-intensity exercise before starting night-shift did not affect glucose tolerance.

=== Current research ===
Skene's current research interests are two-fold. One area is understanding how circadian clocks, sleep, and metabolism relate to each other within people with dysfunctional circadian rhythms, such as shift workers, and those with metabolic disorders, like liver disease or Type 2 diabetes. The other is using liquid chromatography-mass spectrometry metabolomics to explore how various factors such as sleep, food, time of day, and circadian rhythms impact the human metabolome.

== Selected publications ==
- Archer, Simon N, et al. “A Length Polymorphism in the Circadian Clock Gene Per3 Is Linked to Delayed Sleep Phase Syndrome and Extreme Diurnal Preference.” Sleep, vol. 26, no. 4, 1 June 2003, pp. 413–415., doi:10.1093/sleep/26.4.413.
- Arendt, Josephine, and Debra Jean Skene. “Melatonin as a Chronobiotic.” Sleep Medicine Reviews, vol. 9, no. 1, Feb. 2005, pp. 25–39., doi:10.1016/j.smrv.2004.05.002.
- Arendt, Josephine, et al. “Efficacy of Melatonin Treatment in Jet Lag, Shift Work, and Blindness.” Journal of Biological Rhythms, vol. 12, no. 6, 1 Dec. 1997, pp. 604–617., doi:10.1177/074873049701200616.
- Auld, Fiona, et al. "Evidence for the efficacy of melatonin in the treatment of primary adult sleep disorders." Sleep Medicine Reviews, vol. 34, no. 1, Aug. 2017, pp. 10–22., doi:10.1016/j.smrv.2016.06.005.
- Davies, S. K., et al. “Effect of Sleep Deprivation on the Human Metabolome.” Proceedings of the National Academy of Sciences, vol. 111, no. 29, 2014, pp. 10761–10766., doi:10.1073/pnas.1402663111.
- Hack, Lisa M., et al. “The Effects of Low-Dose 0.5-Mg Melatonin on the Free-Running Circadian Rhythms of Blind Subjects.” Journal of Biological Rhythms, vol. 18, no. 5, 1 Oct. 2003, pp. 420–429., doi:10.1177/0748730403256796.
- Lockley, Steven W., et al. “Relationship between Melatonin Rhythms and Visual Loss in the Blind.” The Journal of Clinical Endocrinology & Metabolism, vol. 82, no. 11, 1 Nov. 1997, pp. 3763–3770., doi:10.1210/jcem.82.11.4355.
- Lockley, SW, et al. “Melatonin Administration Can Entrain the Free-Running Circadian System of Blind Subjects.” Journal of Endocrinology, vol. 164, no. 1, 2000, doi:10.1677/joe.0.164r001.
- Lucas, Robert J., et al. “Measuring and Using Light in the Melanopsin Age.” Trends in Neurosciences, vol. 37, no. 1, Jan. 2014, pp. 1–9., doi:10.1016/j.tins.2013.10.004.
- Revell, Victoria L., et al. "Alerting effects of light are sensitive to very short wavelengths." Neuroscience Letters, vol. 399, no. 1-2, May 2006, pp. 96–100., doi:10.1016/j.neulet.2006.01.032.
- Skene, Debra J., et al. “Separation of Circadian- and Behavior-Driven Metabolite Rhythms in Humans Provides a Window on Peripheral Oscillators and Metabolism.” Proceedings of the National Academy of Sciences, vol. 115, no. 30, 2018, pp. 7825–7830., doi:10.1073/pnas.1801183115.
- Skene, Debra J., et al. "Melatonin rhythmicity: effect of age and Alzheimer's disease." Experimental Gerontology, vol. 38, no.1-2, Jan. 2003, pp. 199–206., doi:10.1016/S0531-5565(02)00198-5.
- Thapan, Kavita, et al. “An Action Spectrum for Melatonin Suppression: Evidence for a Novel Non‐Rod, Non‐Cone Photoreceptor System in Humans.” The Journal of Physiology, vol. 535, no. 1, 1 Aug. 2001, pp. 261–267., doi:10.1111/j.1469-7793.2001.t01-1-00261.x.
- Viola, Antoine U., et al. “PER3 Polymorphism Predicts Sleep Structure and Waking Performance.” Current Biology, vol. 17, no. 7, 3 Apr. 2007, pp. 613–618., doi:10.1016/j.cub.2007.01.073.
- Warman, Victoria L., et al. “Phase Advancing Human Circadian Rhythms with Short Wavelength Light.” Neuroscience Letters, vol. 342, no. 1-2, 15 May 2003, pp. 37–40., doi:10.1016/s0304-3940(03)00223-4.
