= Sir George Mackenzie, 7th Baronet =

Scottish geologist, chemist, and agriculturalist

Sir George Steuart Mackenzie, 7th Baronet FRS FRSE FSA (22 June 1780 – 26 October 1848) was a Scottish geologist, chemist and agricultural improver.

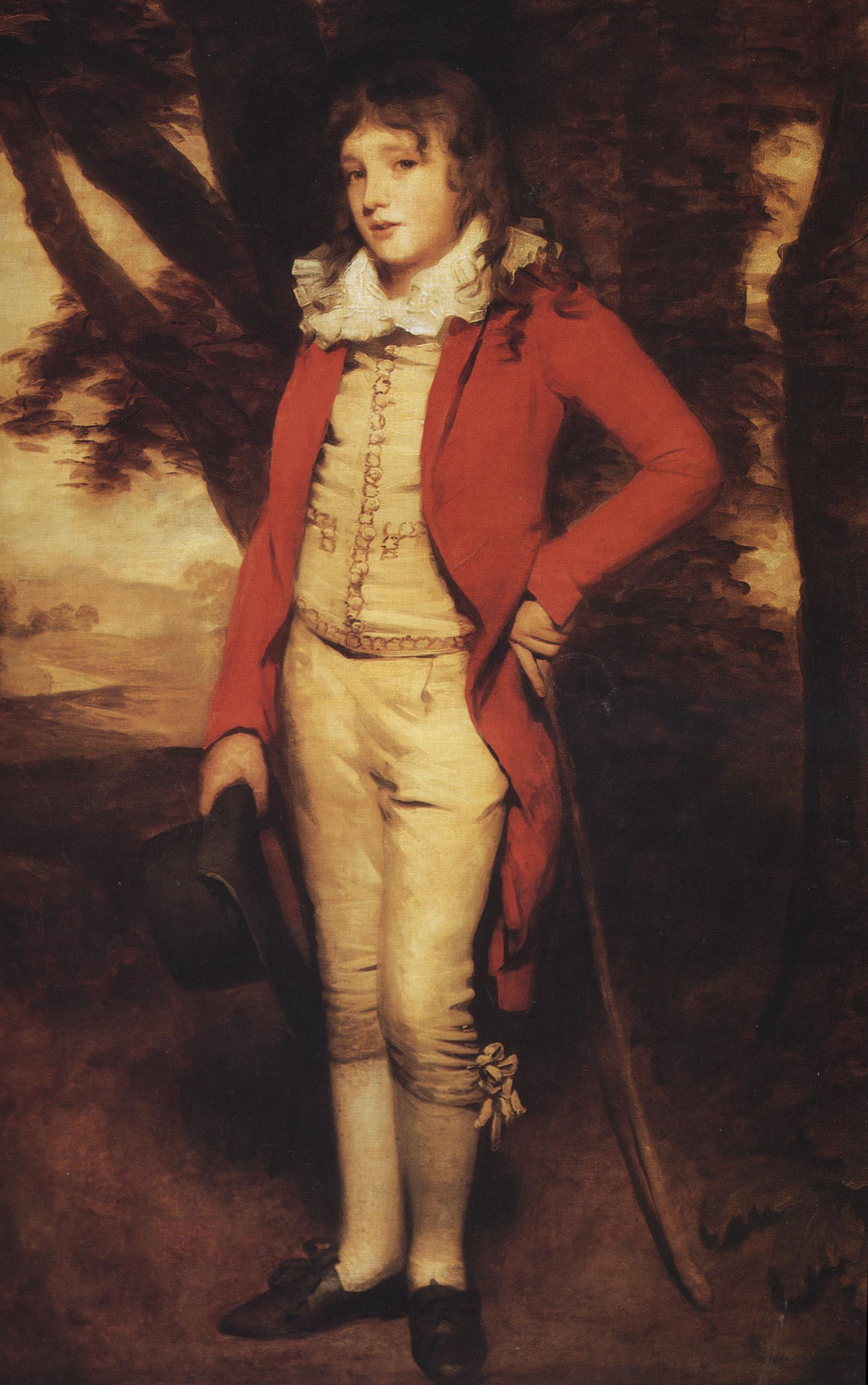
Henry Raeburn. Portrait of Sir G. S. Mackenzie, 7th Bart. Size 63 x 41.5 in.

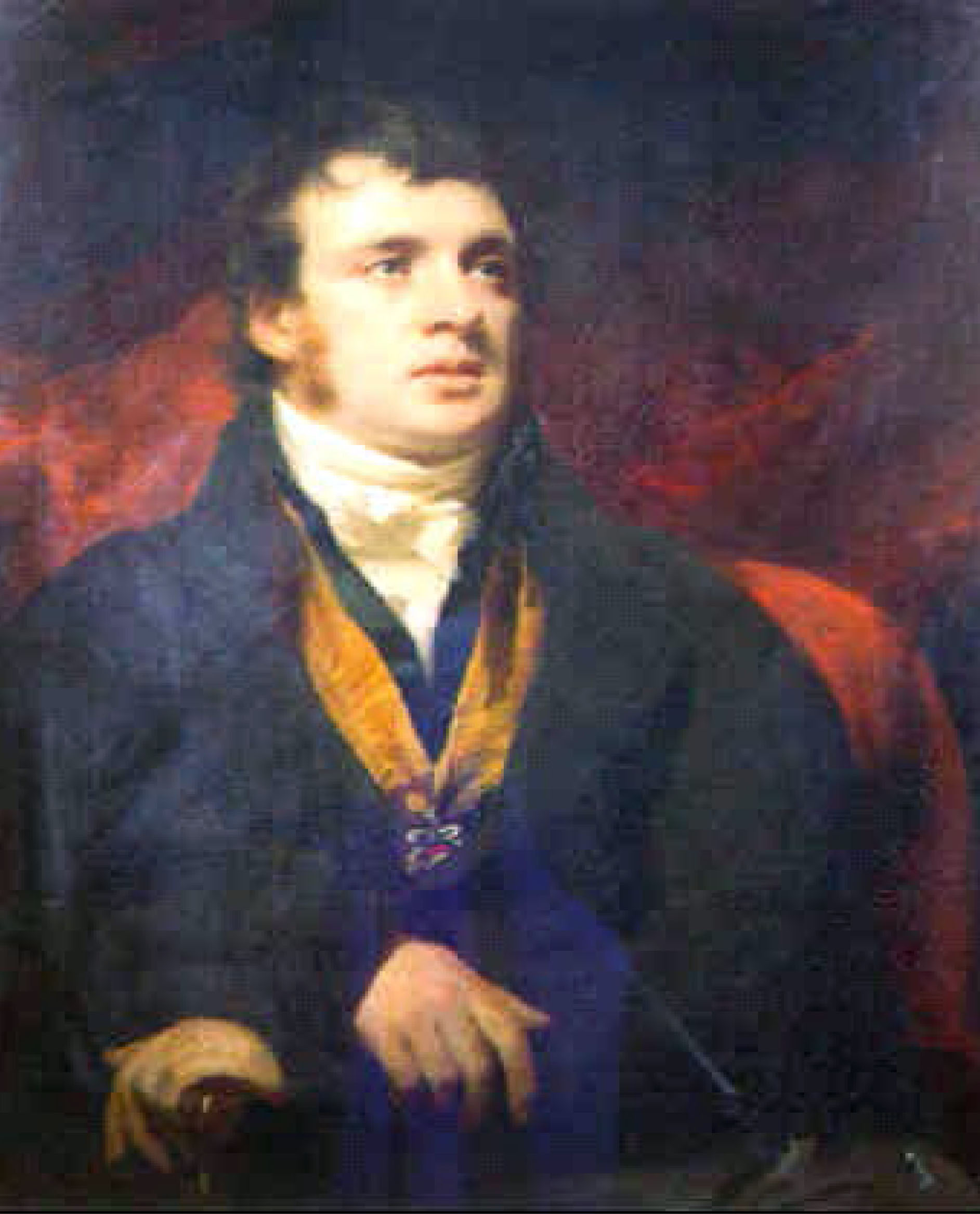
Raeburn. Portrait of Sir G. S. Mackenzie, 7th Bart. Size 27x36 in.

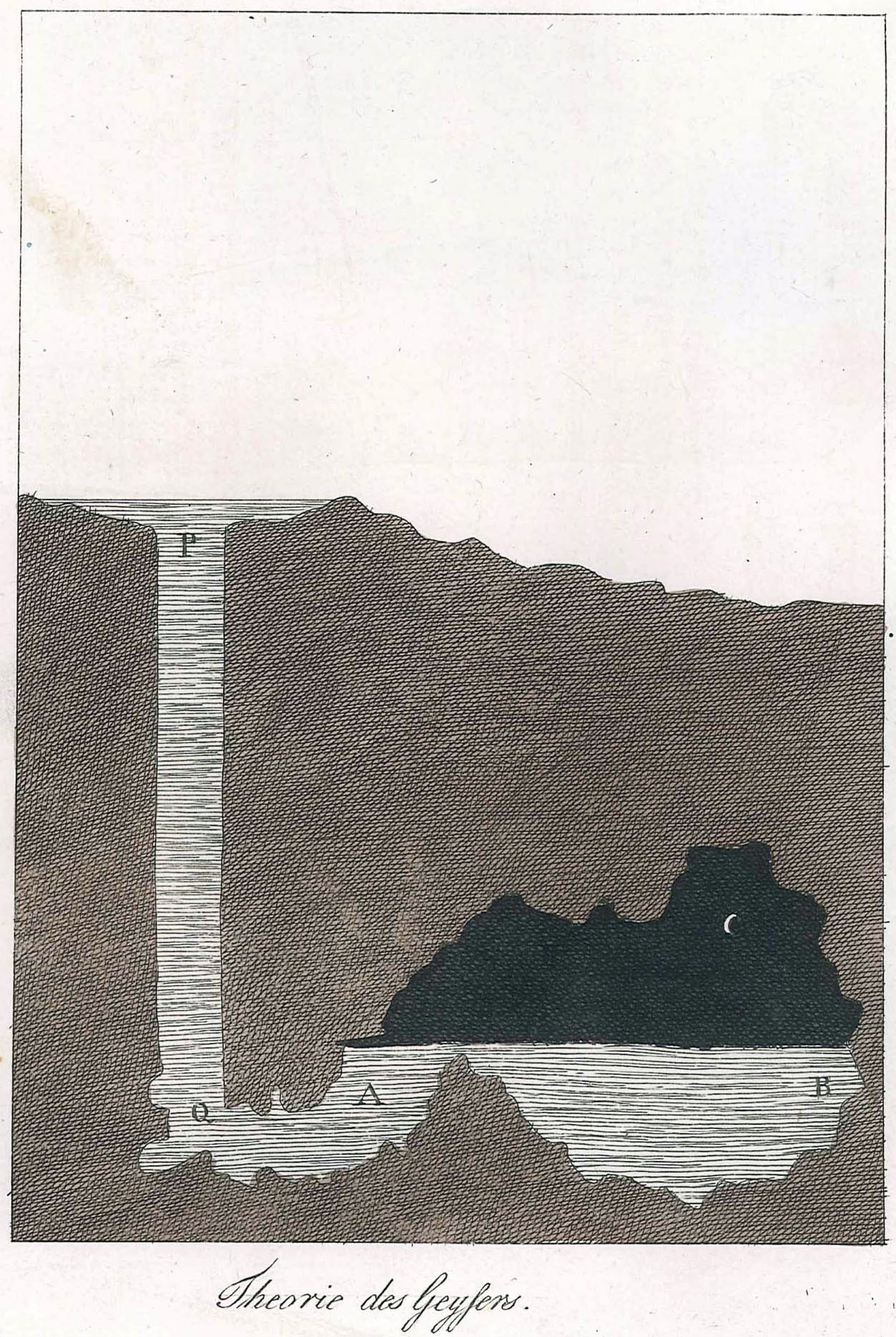
Original drawing of the geyser's underground system suggested by Mackenzie.

== Life ==
The only son of Major General Sir Alexander Mackenzie of Coul (d.1796), a General in the Bengal Army, by his wife Katharine Ramsay (d. 1806), daughter of Robert Ramsay of Camno, he was born on 22 June 1780. He was tutored privately and spent one year at Edinburgh's High School (1795/6). He then studied sciences at the University of Edinburgh.

In 1796, he succeeded to the baronetcy at 16, on his father's death. He first became known to scientists in 1800, when he claimed proof of the identity of diamond with carbon by a series of experiments concerning the formation of steel by the combination of diamonds with iron; for these experiments, he is said to have made free use of his mother's jewels. In 1799, he was elected a Fellow of the Royal Society of Edinburgh. His proposers were Sir James Hall, John Playfair and Thomas Charles Hope. He served as Vice-President of the Society from 1844 to 1848. In 1815, 16 years after his fellowship of the Edinburgh Society, he was also elected a Fellow of the Royal Society of London. He was also President of the Caledonian Horticultural Society.

Pupil and friend of Robert Jameson, Mackenzie devoted much time to studying mineralogy and geology. His interest in those subjects caused him in 1810 to journey to Iceland, when Henry Holland and Richard Bright accompanied him. To illustrate his conclusions about the geology of Iceland, Mackenzie visited the Faroe Islands in 1812, and on his return, read an account of his observations before the Edinburgh Royal Society.

He was the landowner responsible for the clearances of the townships of Inverlael and Balblair near Ullapool during the winter of 1819-20, as part of the Highland Clearances. The clearances evicted families from land to make way for large-scale sheep production or other agricultural uses.

Mackenzie died at his home, Kinellan House, Murrayfield, in western Edinburgh, on 26 October 1848. His home is now subdivided into flats.

== Works ==
In 1811, Bright, Holland and Mackenzie published Travels In Iceland; Mackenzie contributed the narrative of the voyage and the travels, and the chapters on the Island's mineralogy, rural economy, and commerce. Robert Southey reviewed it favourably (Quarterly Review, vii. 48–92). In this book, Mackenzie first proposed an explanation of periodic eruptions of geysers; he envisaged a geyser's underground system that includes a large cavern connected to the ground surface by a contorted conduit.

Mackenzie compiled a report for the Board of Agriculture: General View of the Agriculture of Ross and Cromarty, 1813. From 1826 to 1848, he contributed numerous papers discussing the origin of the Parallel Roads of Lochaber; however, his opinions did not gain acceptance. He also wrote:

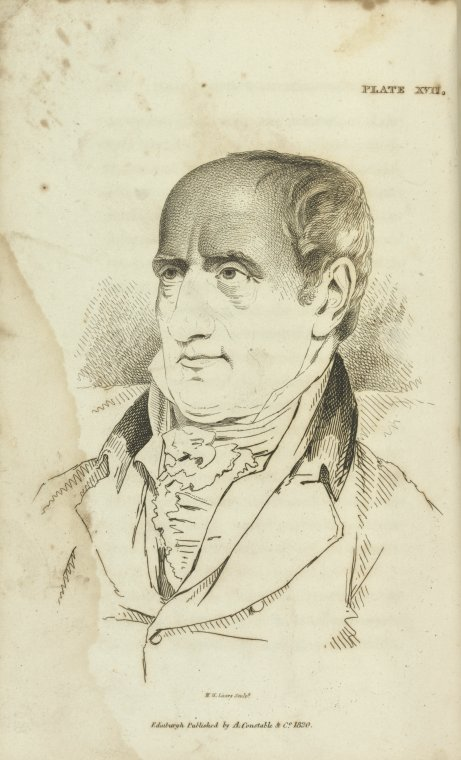
William Godwin, engraving by William Home Lizars from Mackenzie's Illustrations of Phrenology (1820).

- Treatise on the Diseases and Management of Sheep. With … an Appendix containing documents exhibiting the value of the merino breed, Inverness, 1807.
- Travels in the Island of Iceland during the Summer of the Year MDCCCX, Edinburgh, 1811.
- An Account of some Geological Facts observed in the Faroe Islands. Transact. of the Royal Soc. of Edinburgh. Vol. VII. 1815. p. 213
- An Essay on some Subjects connected with Taste, Edinburgh, 1817; 2nd edit. 1842.
- Illustrations of Phrenology. With Engravings, Edinburgh, 1820.
- Documents laid before … Lord Glenelg … relative to the Convicts sent to New South Wales, Edinburgh, 1836.
- General Observations on the Principles of Education, &c. Edinburgh, 1836.
- On the most Recent Disturbance of the Crust of the Earth in respect to its Suggesting a Hypothesis to Account for the Origin of Glaciers (Edinb. New Phil. Journ. xxxiii. 1–9).

== Family ==
Mackenzie married, first, on 8 June 1802, Mary Macleod (d.1835), fifth daughter of Donald Macleod of Geanies, sheriff of Ross-shire, by whom he had seven sons and three daughters. The fourth son, Robert Ramsay Mackenzie, became Premier of Queensland. After her death (13 January 1835), he married in the next year, Catherine Jardine (d.1857), second daughter of Sir Henry Jardine of Harwood, and widow of Captain John Street of the Royal Artillery, by whom he had one son.

His first wife's sister, Isabella Macleod, married James Gregory.

== Honours ==
- Mackenzie Bay in Greenland was named in his honour by William Scoresby (1789 – 1857).

Baronetage of Nova Scotia
Preceded by Alexander Mackenzie	Baronet (of Coul); 1796–1848	Succeeded by Alexander Mackenzie
