= Inverlael =

Village in Ross Shire, Scotland

Coordinates: 57°49′13″N 5°03′45″W

Inverlael is a hamlet on the southern tip of Loch Broom in Ross-shire in the Highland council area in Scotland. It is located on the A835 main road 6 miles from Ullapool and 50 miles from Inverness. It is also atop the River Lael from where it gets its name.

There are also many walking and hiking routes in the area surrounding the hamlet.

== Etymology ==
The name comes from Scottish Gaelic. Inver is the English translation of Inbhir which means the mouth of the river and Lael comes from the River Lael from which the hamlet is situated.

== History ==
Historical records date Inverlael to at least the 13th Century. Until the establishment of Ullapool in 1788 Inverlael was described as ‘the largest settlement north of Dingwall‘.

Sir George Mackenzie, 7th Baronet was the landowner responsible for the clearance of the township during the winter of 1819-20, as part of the Highland Clearances. The clearances evicted families from land to make way for large-scale sheep production or other agricultural uses.
