= Alexandros Lykourgos =

- Archbishop of Syros
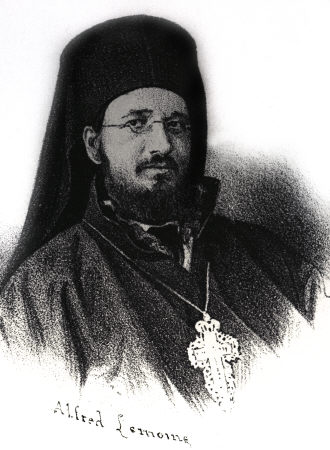
- Church: Eastern Orthodox Church
- Archdiocese: Holy Metropolis of Syros
- Installed: 1866
- Term ended: 17 October 1975

Personal details
- Born: 1827 Chora, Samos
- Died: 17 October 1875 (aged 47–48)

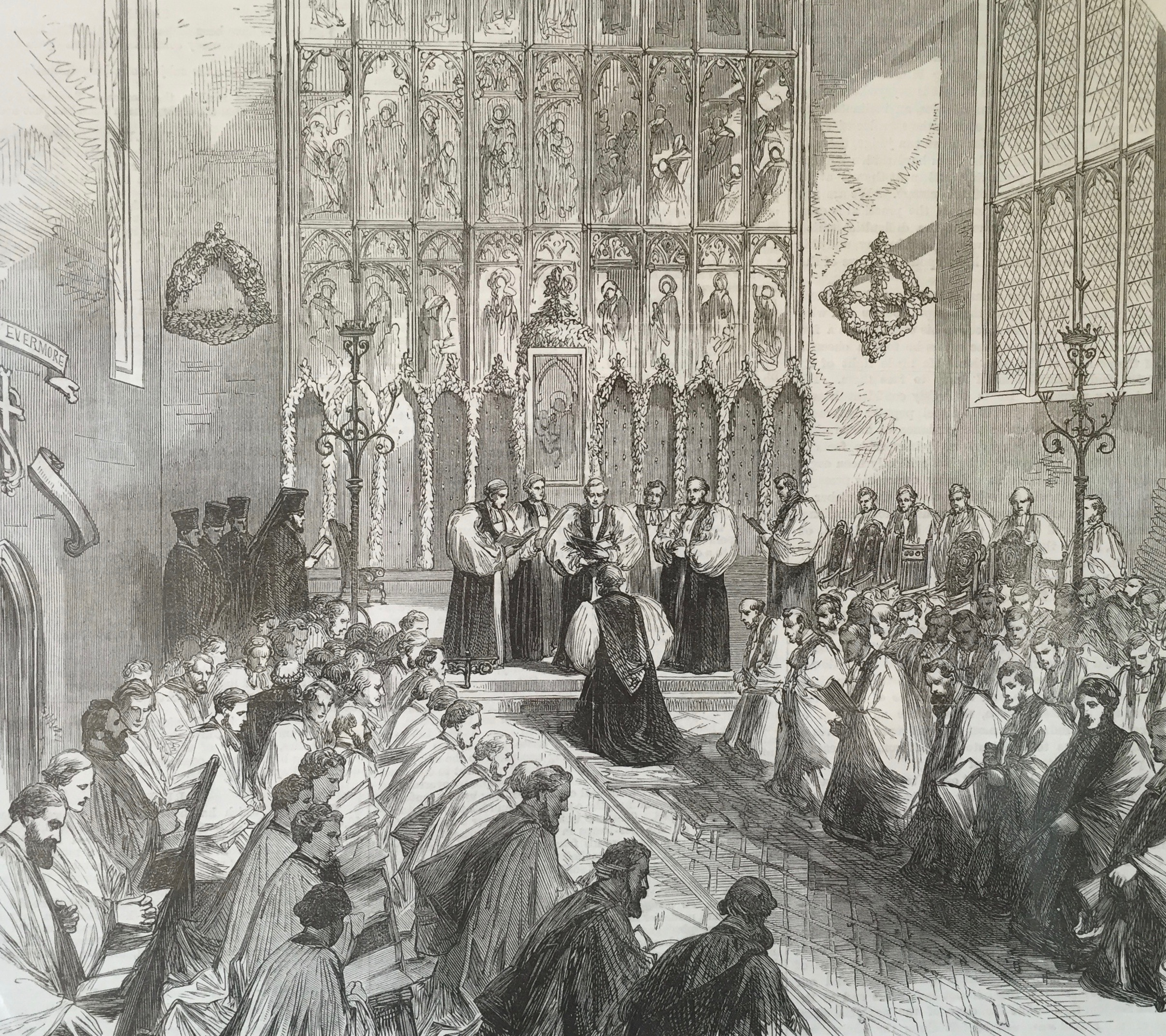
Alexandros Lykourgos on the left of the chancel during the consecration of Henry Mackenzie as Suffragan Bishop of Nottingham on 6 February 1870 in St Mary's Church, Nottingham

Alexandros Lykourgos (Greek: Αλέξανδρος Λυκούργος; 1827–1875) was a Greek

theologian, Greek Orthodox cleric and university professor.

Born in Samos Island in 1827, after extended studies in Germany (Leipzig, Heidelberg, Halle and Berlin) and a pilgrimage to Palestine he returned to Greece in 1858. He was appointed professor of theology at the University of Athens, and elected Greek Orthodox archbishop of Syros and Tenos, islands of the Cyclades with significant Roman Catholic populations with whom according to French consular reports he was in conflictual relations circa 1864.

He is particularly known for his visit to England to consecrate the Greek Orthodox church of St. Nicholas in Liverpool. His visit (1869–70) however took in stays with William Ewart Gladstone at Hawarden, with another Hellenist, Bishop Christopher Wordsworth of Lincoln, with the Bishop of London, honorary degrees from Oxford and Cambridge and a visit to Queen Victoria at Windsor Castle.

Lycurgos was involved in talks with Old Catholics in Bonn, where he stoutly defended the Orthodox position on the Procession of the Holy Spirit and influenced the decision of Old Catholics to abandon the Filioque clause .

He remained Archbishop of Syros until he died died on 17 October 1875 (O.S.).
