= 4 Days, 40 Hours =

1971 book

- Author: Riva Poor
- Language: English
- Publisher: Bursk and Poor Publishing
- Publication date: July 17, 1971
- ISBN: 978-0451612328

4 Days, 40 Hours is a 1971 book by Riva Poor reporting on a "revolution in work and leisure" from a rearranged work week with four days of 10 hours each. The book shows how some companies can increase production and profit while giving employees more time off.

The book was inspired by an article in the Boston Globe about the successful introduction of the four-day week in a Kyanize Paints factory in Everett, Massachusetts.

== Reception ==
In 1971, the book received attention in a New York Times article that tied it to a growing trend in companies to allow a four-day workweek. Heartened by the response, Poor said, "I predict that within the next five years just about every business in the country will be giving it serious consideration." In another article about the four-day workweek in 1976, The New York Times called 4 Days, 40 Hours "the definitive reference work in this field."

A 1975 review of the book's second edition in The Journal of Human Resources said that Poor "can only be described as radiantly positive about [the 4-day workweek's] potential for good, and utterly unconvinced by the negative criticism from trade union and other sources... She is definitely not impressed by the argument that 10-hour days are fatiguing, or that they represent a regression to 19th century standards." While she does not give much attention to alternatives, "this focus does permit her to concentrate on presenting us with a spirited defense of a four-day, 40-hour schedule, and, as such, her book is to be recommended."

The book's publication led to an increase in her management consulting work; according to a 1979 UPI profile, "The book quickly became a hot item in American industry, and her star was launched."

However, the concept did not actually catch on, and in 1989, an article in the Boston Globe called it "a management fad that went the way of zero-based budgeting and the Boston Consulting Group's cow-and-doggy grid."

David Hamilton wrote, "Her research indicates that the shorter week is most successful in small, nondiversified industries."

A review by Leon E. Lunden in Monthly Labor Review reads, ""repetitive and spotty as it is in part, the book nevertheless reflects the enthusiasm of the various authors for 4-40 and their conviction that it will spread rapidly".
