= George Skene (physician) =

Scottish physician

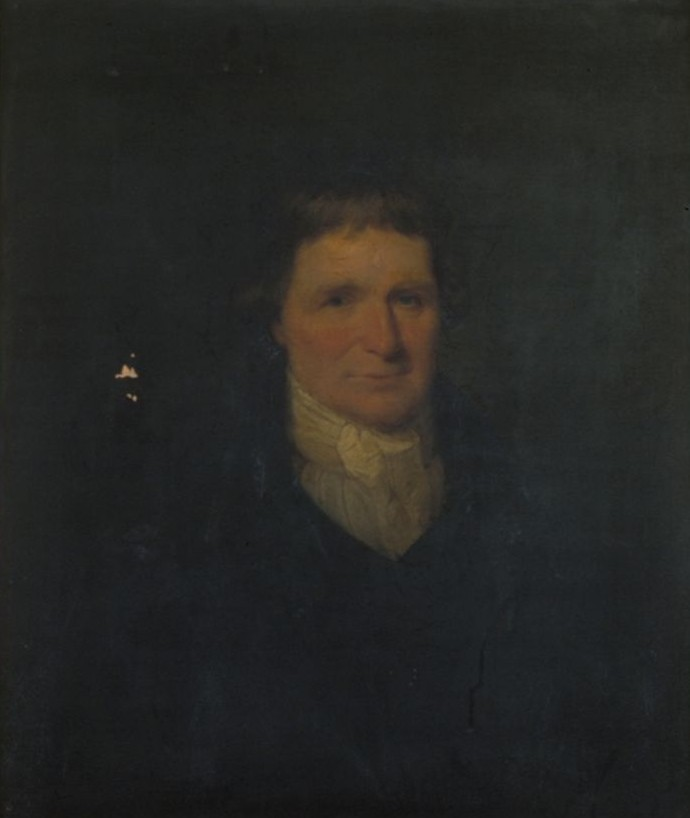
Portrait by John Megget

Prof George Skene of Rubislaw FSA Scot FRSE (1741–1803) was an 18th-century Scottish physician who co-founded the Royal Society of Edinburgh in 1783.

== Life ==
He was born in Rubislaw House in Aberdeen in 1741 the son of Francis Skene, regent of Marischal College and great grandson of George Skene, provost of Aberdeen.

He studied medicine at Aberdeen University. In 1760 (aged only 19) he became professor of medicine and regent of Marischal College (in the place of his father). In 1775 he became professor of natural philosophy. In 1788 he became professor of civil and natural history.

He died in Aberdeen on 25 March 1803.

== Family ==
Skene married Margaret Gordon, daughter of Charles Gordon of Abergeldie. They had 11 children. Their daughter Emelia married Edmund Filmer, and was mother of Sir Edmund Filmer, 8th Baronet.
