= Felicia Skene =

Scottish writer and philanthropist (1821–1899)

- Born: Felicia Mary Frances Skene; 23 May 1821; Aix-en-Provence, France
- Died: 6 October 1899 (aged 78); Oxford, England
- Occupations: Writer and philanthropist
- Writing career
- Pen name: Erskine Moir

Felicia Mary Frances Skene (23 May 1821 – 6 October 1899), also known by the pseudonyms Erskine Moir and Francis Scougal, was a Scottish writer, philanthropist and prison reformer of the Victorian era.

== Life ==
Skene was born on 23 May 1821 in Aix-en-Provence, France, the youngest daughter of Jane Forbes, daughter of Sir William Forbes, sixth baronet of Pitsligo and James Skene of Rubislaw. Moving with her family to Edinburgh, Scotland, as a child, she played with the children of the exiled King Charles X of France at Holyrood Palace. Her father was a great friend of Sir Walter Scott, and it is said that as a child Skene would sit on the novelist's knee and tell him fairy tales. As a girl, she was the guest of Stratford Canning at the embassy at Constantinople; and later was the friend of, among others, Florence Nightingale, Sir John Franklin, E. B. Pusey, Walter Savage Landor and William Edmondstoune Aytoun.

In 1838, the family moved to Greece on account of her mother's health. Her father built a villa near Athens, in which they lived for some time. They returned to England in 1845, and lived first at Leamington and later in Oxford.

Skene was an accomplished woman and devoted to good works. When, in 1854, cholera broke out at Oxford, she took part, under Sir Henry Acland, in organising a band of nurses. Some of them were sent afterwards to the Crimea, and during the war Skene remained in constant correspondence with Florence Nightingale. She took much interest in rescue work in Oxford, working with prostitutes and tramps, and was one of the first "lady visitors" appointed by the Home Office to visit the prison. Some of her experiences were told in a series of articles in Blackwood's Magazine, published in book form in 1889, and entitled Scenes from a Silent World.

Her earliest published work was Isles of Greece, and other Poems, which appeared in 1843. A devotional work, The Divine Master, was published in 1852 and memoirs of her cousin Alexander Penrose Forbes, bishop of Brechin, and of Alexandros Lykourgos, archbishop of the Cyclades, in 1876 and 1877 respectively. In 1866, she published anonymously a book called Hidden Depths. It was republished with her name and an introduction by Mr. W. Shepherd Allen in 1886. Though to all appearance a novel, the author states that it is not a work of fiction in the ordinary acceptation of the term, as she herself witnessed many of the scenes described. She was a constant contributor to the magazines, and edited the Churchman's Companion, 1862–80.

She died at 34 St Michael's Street, Oxford, on 6 October 1899, and was buried in St Thomas's churchyard, Oxford.

A blue plaque was installed on the house on 2 July 2002 by the Oxfordshire Blue Plaques Board.

== Selected publications ==
Skene's works include:

- The Isles of Greece and Other Poems (1843)
- The Lesters (1847)
- Wayfaring Sketches (1847)
- The Inheritance of Evil: Or, the Consequence of Marrying a Deceased Wife's Sister (1849)
- The Tutor's Ward (1851) — in two volumes
- The Divine Master (1852)
- Penitentiaries and Reformatories (1865)
- The Shadow of the Holy Week (1883)
- Scenes from a Silent World: Or Prisons and their Inmates (1889)
- A Test of the Truth (1897)
