= Joseph Robertson (historian) =

Scottish historian and record scholar (1810–1866)

Joseph Robertson FSA (17 May 1810 – 13 December 1866) was a Scottish historian and record scholar.

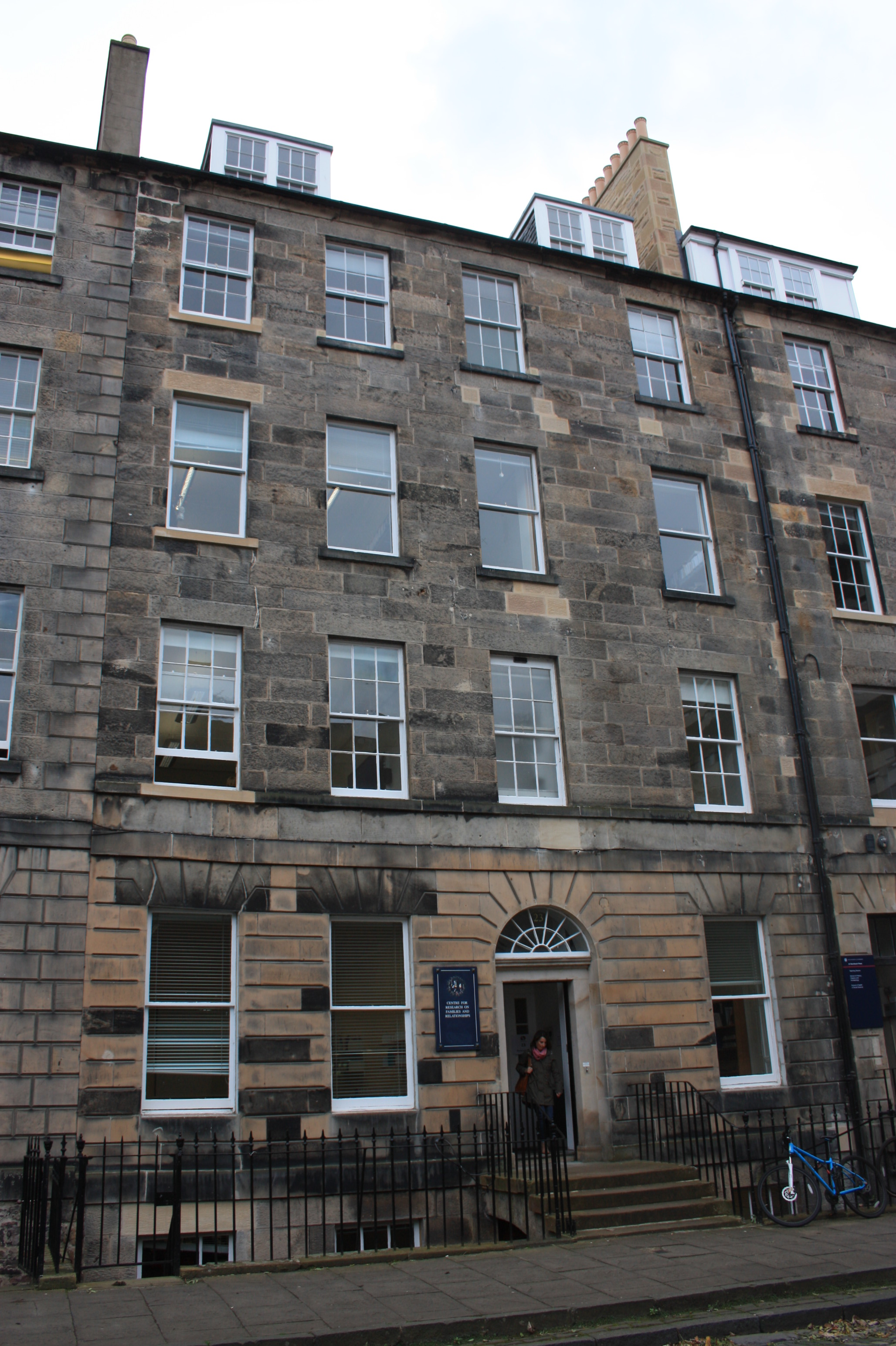
23 Buccleuch Place, Edinburgh

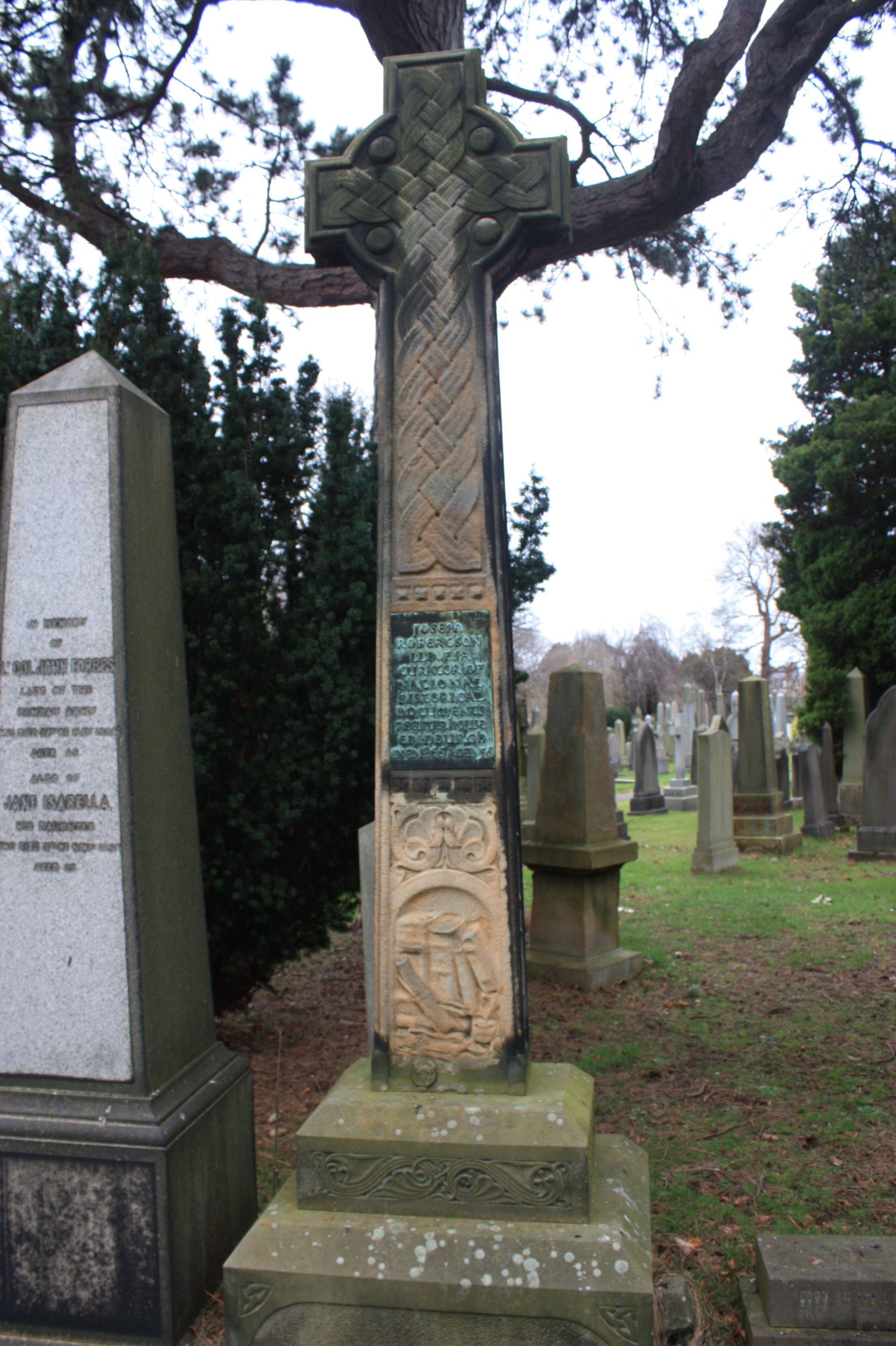
The grave of Joseph Robertson, Dean Cemetery

== Life ==
He was born in Aberdeen, Scotland on 17 May 1810. His father, having tried his fortune in England, had returned to his native county, where he was first a small farmer, and afterwards a small shopkeeper, at Wolmanhill, Aberdeen. His mother was left a widow when Joseph was only seven, and he was educated at Udny parish school under Mr. Bisset, where James Outram was one of his comrades, and afterwards at the grammar school and Marischal College, Aberdeen, where he acquired a sound knowledge of Latin, but was more distinguished for physical than mental ability. John Hill Burton, the historian of Scotland, was his contemporary at school and university, and his lifelong friend.

On leaving Marischal College he was apprenticed to an advocate, as solicitors are called in Aberdeen, but soon showed a taste for literature, writing in the Aberdeen Magazine in 1831, and publishing under the name of John Brown, a Deeside coachman, in 1835, a Guide to Deeside, and in 1838 a guide to Aberdeen, called The Book of Bon Accord. In this book, though never completed, he first proved his exact knowledge of antiquities, and there is no better account of his native city. His Deliciæ Literariæ, published in the following year, showed a cultivated taste in literature, and the collection of the masterpieces in it helped to form his own style.

The foundation in 1839 of the Spalding Club, which was due to Robertson and his friend Dr. John Stuart, for the publication of historical records and rare memoirs of the north of Scotland, gave Robertson his opportunity; and although the club had many learned editors, none surpassed him in fulness and accuracy. His chief contribution was the Collections for a History of the Shires of Aberdeen and Banff, 1842, which formed the preface to Illustrations of the Topography and Antiquities of Aberdeen and Banff (vol. ii. 1847, vol. iii. 1858, vol. iv. 1869). This is the most complete series of records, public and private, which any county in Scotland has yet published. He also edited, for the same club, the Diary of General Patrick Gordon, a.d. 1635–1699, in 1862, and in 1841, along with Dr. Grub, Gordon of Rothiemay, History of Scots Affairs from 1637 to 1641.

He paid a short visit to Edinburgh in 1833 and engaged in historical work, but found it so unremunerative that he returned to Aberdeen, and supported himself chiefly by writing for the Aberdeen Courier, afterwards the Aberdeen Constitutional, which he edited for four years. In 1843 he went to Glasgow, where he edited the Glasgow Constitutional down to 1849, when he moved to Edinburgh as editor of the ‘Courant’ (1849–53).

The political principles of Robertson, and of all the papers he edited, were conservative; but he had many friends of other views, and received from the whig Lord-advocate Moncreiff—it is said, at the instance of Lord Aberdeen—the appointment of historical curator of the records in the Edinburgh Register House in 1853. "The Ultima Thule of my desires would be a situation in the Register House," he wrote to his friend Hill Burton in 1833. He had to wait twenty years, to the great loss of Scottish history. Although the office received a new name, Robertson's work was practically a continuation of that begun by William Robertson (1740–1799) and Thomas Thomson as deputy clerk-register. In his new sphere Robertson was aided by the counsels of Cosmo Innes and Hill Burton, and supported by his official superiors, the Marquis of Dalhousie and Sir J. Gibson Craig.

Among his duties were the arrangement and selection of such records as were of special value, their publication in a manner similar to that of the series published under the direction of the master of the rolls in England, so far as the meagre grants to Scotland permitted, and the answering constant inquiries into all branches of Scottish history. The last duty, performed with kindly courtesy and keen intelligence, took up much of his time. Always diligent, and working perhaps somewhat beyond his physical strength, Robertson edited in 1863 the Inventories of Jewels, Dresses, Furniture, Books, and Paintings belonging to Queen Mary, and Concilia Ecclesiæ Scoticanæ in 1866, which are among the best publications of the Bannatyne Club. The Concilia is Robertson's chief work; for, besides collecting the whole extant record sources for the history of the councils of the church of Scotland prior to the Reformation, he filled the notes with such copious stores of learning as to make them almost an ecclesiastical history of Scotland during the period. An article on 'Scottish Abbeys and Cathedrals' in the Quarterly Review for 1849 gave further proof of his fitness to undertake a complete ecclesiastical history of Scotland. His contributions to Chambers's Encyclopaedia on topics of Scottish history, civil as well as ecclesiastical, were valuable results of original research.

He died at home 23 Buccleuch Place in south Edinburgh on 13 Dec. 1866, soon after completing the Concilia. He was survived by his wife, two sons, and two daughters. He is buried in Dean Cemetery in western Edinburgh. The grave lies in the second row back on the western path, facing "Lords Row", roughly midway along its length. The tall, narrow Celtic cross carries a carving of books and manuscripts at its base.

His position at Register House was filled by Thomas Dickson.

Queen Victoria granted a pension to his wife of £100 a year, in consideration of Robertson's "services to literature, and especially illustrative of the ancient history of Scotland."
