= Mary Burton (disambiguation) =

Mary Burton (1819–1909) was a Scottish social- and educational reformer, suffragist, and governor.

Mary Burton may also refer to:

- Mary Burton, Irish 16-year-old indentured servant who was arrested in the New York Conspiracy of 1741
- Mary Burton (activist) (born 1940), Argentine-born South African political activist
- Mary Rose Hill Burton (1859–1900), Scottish artist and conservationist
