= Book of Deer =

Gospel book

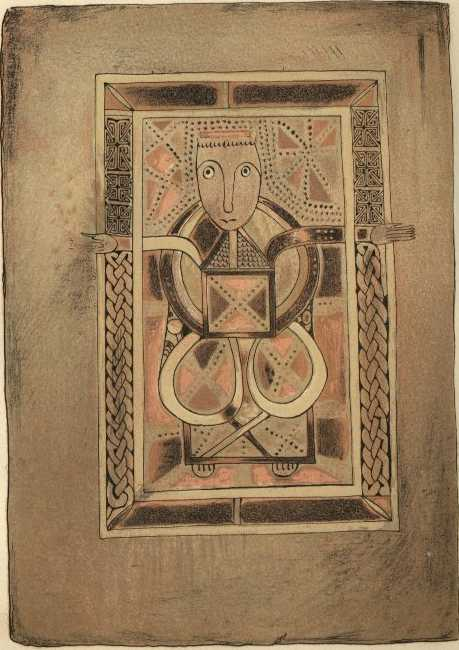
Folio 29v contains a portrait of the Evangelist Luke.

The Book of Deer (Scottish Gaelic: Leabhar Dhèir) (Cambridge University Library, MS. Ii.6.32) is a 10th-century Latin Gospel Book with additions, dated to the early 12th century, in Latin, Old Irish and Scottish Gaelic. It contains the earliest surviving Gaelic writing from Scotland. Of the four Gospels included in the manuscript, only the Gospel of John survives in complete form. Each of the four Gospels in the Book of Deer is introduced by a full-page illustration, found on folios 1v, 16v, 29v, and 41v.

The origin of the book is uncertain, but it is reasonable to assume that the manuscript was at Deer, Aberdeenshire, Scotland, when the marginalia were made. It may be the oldest surviving manuscript produced in Scotland (although see Book of Kells), and is notable for having possibly originated in what is now considered a Lowland area. The manuscript belongs to the category of Irish pocket gospel books, which were produced for private use rather than for church services. While the manuscripts to which the Book of Deer is closest in character are all Irish, most scholars argue for a Scottish origin, although the book was undoubtedly written by an Irish scribe. The book has 86 folios; the leaves measure 157 mm by 108 mm, the text area 108 mm by 71 mm. It is written on vellum in brown ink and is in a modern binding.

The Book of Deer has been in the ownership of the Cambridge University Library since 1715, when the library of John Moore, Bishop of Ely, was presented to the University of Cambridge by King George I.

== Contents ==
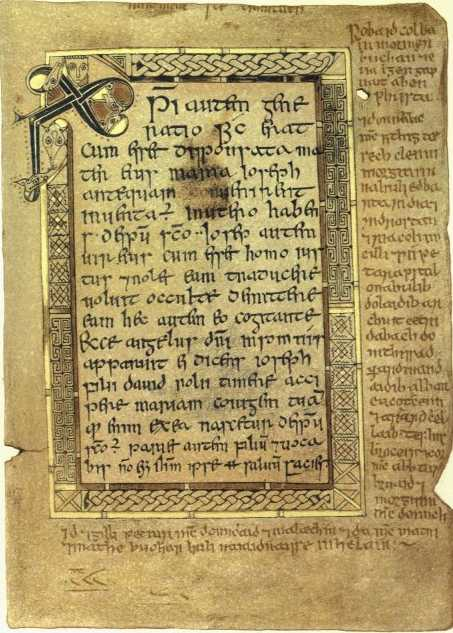
Folio 5r contains the text of the Gospel of Matthew from 1:18 through 1:21. Note the Chi Rho monogram in the upper left corner. The margins contain Gaelic text.

The Latin text contains the complete text of the Gospel of John, portions of the Gospels of Matthew, Mark and Luke, a portion of an Office for the Visitation of the Sick, and the Apostles' Creed. It ends with a colophon in Old Irish. The Gospel texts are based on the Vulgate but contain some peculiarities unique to Irish Gospel books. The texts are written in an Irish minuscule text, apparently by a single scribe. Although the text and the script of the manuscript place it squarely in the tradition of the Irish pocket gospel, scholars have argued that the manuscript was produced in Scotland.

There are seven Scottish Gaelic texts written in blank spaces surrounding the main items. These marginalia include an account of the founding of the monastery at Deer by St Columba and St Drostan, records of five land grants to the monastery, and a record of an immunity from payment of certain dues granted to the monastery. There is also a copy of a Latin deed granted to the monastery by David I of Scotland protecting the monastery from "all lay service and improper exaction". The Gaelic texts were written by as many as five different hands. These represent the earliest surviving use of Gaelic in Scotland and are important for the light they shed on the development of Gaelic in Scotland.

The Book of Deer has a number of errors. In the genealogy of Jesus in the Gospel of Luke, it records Seth as the first man and grandfather of Adam.

=== Illumination ===
The manuscript is illuminated. It has a complete and well thought out illumination programme. There are four full page Evangelist portraits. Each portrait faces a page of text surrounded by a border of interlace. Each of these text pages has a large decorated initial. The book opens with a full-page miniature of the four evangelists and closes with two facing pages each also with a full-page miniature of the evangelists. The final text of John ends with a half-page miniature of two men. There are small decorated initial letters throughout the text. There are also ten pages, all in the final half of the book, with marginal drawings of men, animals, or simple doodles.

== Provenance ==
The manuscript derives its name from the monastery of Deer, mentioned in the Gaelic texts and the Latin Charter of King David I. The foundation at Old Deer has left no other trace of its existence, although a Cistercian monastery, Deer Abbey, founded nearby in 1219, owned some of the lands mentioned in the Gaelic texts. The manuscript came to Cambridge University Library in 1715 when the collection of John Moore, Bishop of Ely, was purchased by King George I and presented to the University. It is likely that the book was in the possession of Thomas Gale (died 1702), the headmaster of St Paul's School, London. It is not known how the manuscript came to be in the library of Bishop Moore, but some suspect it may have been looted during the Wars of Scottish Independence in the late 13th century to early 14th century.

== Primary sources ==
- Macbain, Alexander (ed. and tr.). "The Book of Deer." Transactions of the Gaelic Society of Inverness 11 (1885): 137–166. Available from the Internet Archive
- Stuart, John (ed.). The Book of Deer. Edinburgh: Spalding Club, 1869. Including translations by Whitley Stokes. Available from the Internet Archive
- Jackson, K.H. (ed. and tr.). The Gaelic Notes in the Book of Deer. The Osborn Bergin Memorial Lecture 1970. Cambridge, 1972. Edition and translation (pp. 30-6) available from CELT
