= John Spalding (historian) =

Scottish historian

John Spalding (fl. 1650) was a Scottish historian, possibly a native of Aberdeen.

The name was uncommon there in the sixteenth and seventeenth centuries, but the registers for New Aberdeen record the marriage of "Alexander Spalding and Cristine Hervie" (i.e. Herries) on 7 Feb. 1608. John Spalding became a lawyer, and resided in the 'Old town, Aberdeen'. For many years he acted as clerk to the consistorial court for the diocese; and his office, the records of which were burnt in 1721, was within the precincts of the old cathedral of St. Machar. The latest trace of him occurs in a notarial document in his own handwriting, dated 30 Jan. 1663, whereby David, bishop of Aberdeen, acknowledges to have received from Robert Forbes of Glastermuir 25l. 7s. 4d. as feu duty for these lands from Martinmas to Whitsun 1661 and 1662.

Spalding was the author of a valuable annalistic History of the Troubles and Memorable Transactions in Scotland between 1624 and 1645. This is a simple narrative of current events, interspersed with copies of documents which no doubt came into Spalding's hands in his official capacity. The work was left incomplete. It begins and ends abruptly, commencing with a feud between the Earl of Moray and the Clan Chattan, and ending with Sir John Hurry's junction with General Baillie. Spalding wrote as a shrewd, well-informed, conscientious, yet in the ecclesiastical sense no bigoted, royalist. Charles I he held in the highest veneration. The parliamentarian régime jarred harshly on his conservative instincts, and he deplored many outrages on the fabric of the cathedral of Aberdeen and the prohibition of merrymaking on Christmas Day.

Spalding's History was first published in Aberdeen (2 vols. 8vo, 1792); it was re-edited for the Bannatyne Club by James Skene (4to, 1829), and again by Dr. John Stuart for the Spalding Club (4to, 1850).

In 1839 an antiquarian publishing society, founded at Aberdeen, was named after the historian the Spalding Club. The latest publication is dated 1871. The New Spalding Club, with similar objectives, was founded at Aberdeen in 1886.
