= W. K. Burton =

Scottish engineer and photographer (1856–1899)

William Kinnimond Burton
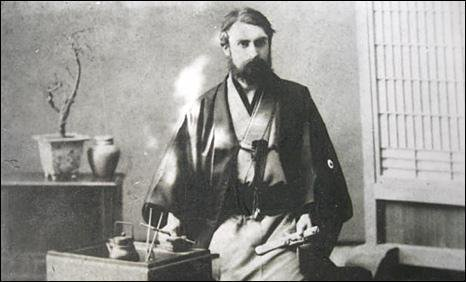
- William Kinnimond Burton
- Born: 11 May 1856; Edinburgh, Scotland
- Died: 5 August 1899 (aged 43); Tokyo, Japan
- Citizenship: United Kingdom of Great Britain and Ireland
- Scientific career
- Fields: Sanitary engineering

William Kinnimond Burton (11 May 1856 – 5 August 1899) was a Scottish engineer, photographer and photography writer, born in Edinburgh, Scotland, who lived most of his career in Meiji era Japan.

== Biography ==
=== Early life ===
Burton was born in Edinburgh to John Hill Burton, a lawyer and amateur historian, who had written two books on economics, which had received attention in Japan. His mother was Katherine, daughter of Dr Cosmo Innes, one of Scotland's foremost amateur photographers. He was also a childhood friend of Sir Arthur Conan Doyle, who turned to him for background information for The Engineer's Thumb; Doyle's book, The Firm of Girdlestone, is dedicated to Burton. Conan Doyle lodged with Burton's aunt Mary while a student in Edinburgh.

Burton studied at Edinburgh Collegiate School, but instead of going on to university, from 1873 he signed up for a five-year apprenticeship with the innovative hydraulic and mechanical engineers Brown Brothers & Co. Ltd at the Rosebank Ironworks in Edinburgh. Rising to become chief draftsman, he left the firm in 1879 to enter partnership with his uncle Cosmo Innes in London designing water systems. In 1881 he became Resident Engineer to the London Sanitary Protection Association.

=== Career in Japan ===
In May 1887 he was invited by the Meiji government to assume the post of first unofficial professor of sanitary engineering at Tokyo Imperial University (he lectured as an engineer), at a time when the country was dealing with several serious epidemics, notably cholera. His appointment was unusual in that Burton was largely self-educated, and did not come with the impressive educational or professional credentials that many of his contemporaries had. It is not known who recommended Burton to the Japanese government, or what inspired him to leave a promising career in London for what he believed to be a temporary assignment in Japan. He met Nagai Kyuichiro, an officer of the Sanitary Department of the Japan Home Ministry and of the Tokyo Imperial University, while Nagai was staying in London. Nagai invited him to Japan.

Burton helped train a number of prominent water system engineers for nine years, and became the sole consultant engineer for the Sanitary Department of the Home Ministry, planning and managing the water and drainage systems of numerous cities, including Tokyo. His achievements are considered the starting point of Japan's environmental and sanitary engineering. The sand filtration system he built in Shimonoseki city, Yamaguchi prefecture is still functional today, and the water bottled there for disaster preparation has Burton's picture on the label.

Burton also designed Japan's first skyscrapers, Ryōunkaku in Osaka and in Asakusa, Tokyo. The 12-story, 68.58-metre (225.0 ft) tall structure was the tallest building in Tokyo at the time it opened in 1890. This octagonal building gained iconic status as a symbol of modern Japan, and boasted Japan's first electric lift. It was damaged beyond repair in the 1923 Great Kantō earthquake and had to be demolished.

Burton was a noted photographer and made a substantial contribution to Japan's photographic history. He published several technical works on photography, and made a contribution in the introduction of Japanese culture to the West by sending his own photographs to various London magazines. He also did much to publicise the works of fledgling Japanese photographers in Britain. Burton worked with seismologist John Milne in co writing and co photographing a book that recorded the disastrous great earthquake of 1891. The book illustrated the plight of the Japanese people and the impact of an earthquake on their environment, in dramatic images that were printed by Ogawa Kazumasa

In addition to photographing the 1891 Mino–Owari earthquake, Burton also photographed Japanese costumes and customs, Hakone, Mount Fuji, and scenes from daily life. He was closely associated with Japanese photographer and collotype printer Ogawa Kazumasa. With Ogawa, Burton was a founding member of the Japan Photographic Society, Japan's first organisation for amateur photographers.

In 1896, after his term at Tokyo Imperial University expired, Burton went to Japanese Formosa as an engineer, where he made outstanding contributions to improving the sanitation systems in Taiwanese cities under the authority of the Japanese Governor-General of Taiwan. He then returned to Japan proper in 1899.

Burton began cohabitation with a Japanese woman, Orakawa Matsu from 1892. On 19 May 1894, he married her at a ceremony at the British Consulate in Tokyo. Burton had a daughter, Tamako, with another woman.

Burton had intended to return with his family to Scotland to meet his mother, but suddenly fell ill from a liver infection and died on 5 August 1899 at the age of 43.

== Honours and awards ==
His grave at Aoyama Cemetery in Tokyo is marked by an impressive monument erected by his friends and former pupils.

In 2006, a memorial was also erected in his home town of Edinburgh, in honour of the 150th anniversary of his birth. The memorial was dedicated at the Burton family home, Craig House, now part of the Craighouse Campus of Edinburgh Napier University.

In 2018 he was inducted into the Scottish Engineering Hall of Fame.

== Selected works ==
- The ABC of Modern Photography (1884)
- Modern Photography (1887)
- The Process of Pure Photography (1889)
- The Great Earthquake of Japan (1891) (text by John Milne)
- The Volcanos of Japan, 1892 (text by John Milne)
- Practical Guide to Photography (1892)
- Outdoor Life in Japan (1893) (text by J Murdoch)
- Wrestlers and Wrestling in Japan (1895) (text by J Inoue)

== Bibliography ==
- Checkland, Olive (2003). Japan and Britain After 1859: Creating Cultural Bridges. RoutledgeCurzon. ISBN 0-7007-1747-1.
- Cortazzi, Hugh (2003). Britain and Japan, Biographical Portraits. RoutledgeCurzon. ISBN 1-903350-14-X.
- Hannavy, John (2008). Encyclopedia of Nineteenth-century Photography. CRC Press. ISBN 978-0-415-97235-2.
