= Mary Rose Hill Burton =

British artist and conservationist

Mary Rose Hill Burton (10 July 1859 – 5 June 1900) was a British artist and conservationist. She was active in the failed protests against the location of a smelting plant at the Falls of Foyers, near Loch Ness, in Inverness-shire.

== Early life and education ==
Mary Rose Hill Burton was born in Edinburgh in 1859, into a well-educated and prominent family: her father was historian John Hill Burton, and her grandfather was legal scholar Cosmo Innes. Her uncle was Robert Finlay, who served as Lord Chancellor of Great Britain; and her aunt, Mary Burton, was the first female director of the Watt Institution and School of Arts in Edinburgh. Mary Rose's mother, Katherine Innes Burton, had studied sculpture before working as a nurse in the Crimean War, and was an officer in the Edinburgh Ladies' Educational Association (ELEA). The Burtons were friends to the young Arthur Conan Doyle.

Mary Rose was educated with support from the Edinburgh Association for the University Education of Women, and pursued further art studies in Munich and Paris, under the instruction of Gustave Courtois and Raphael Collins, among others.

== Career ==
Mary Rose Hill Burton's paintings (still lifes, landscapes, and street scenes) were exhibited through the Royal Scottish Academy and the Society of Scottish Artists. She was a founder of the Edinburgh Lady Artists' Club (1889). In 1895 and 1896, she had two solo exhibitions in London, to showcase works from her travels in Japan, painted while visiting her older brother W. K. Burton. Burton painted murals as well, most notably a series of panels depicting the seasons, in the dining room of St. Giles' House, Ramsay Garden, the property of sociologist Patrick Geddes. "Miss Hill Burton may be heartily congratulated upon the complete success of her undertaking," noted a contemporary critic of the mural. She also taught a course in "Painting and Decoration" at the Old Edinburgh School of Art.

Mary Rose Hill Burton was active in the unsuccessful resistance against the North British Aluminium Company's plans to locate a smelting plant at the scenic Falls of Foyers, near her residence in the Highlands. She made many drawings and paintings of the Falls before the plant was built, to capture the landscape before it was lost.

Mary Rose Hill Burton died in 1900, whilst travelling and working in Rome; she was 42 years old.
