= Ogawa Kazumasa =

Japanese photographer, printer and publisher

- 小川 一眞
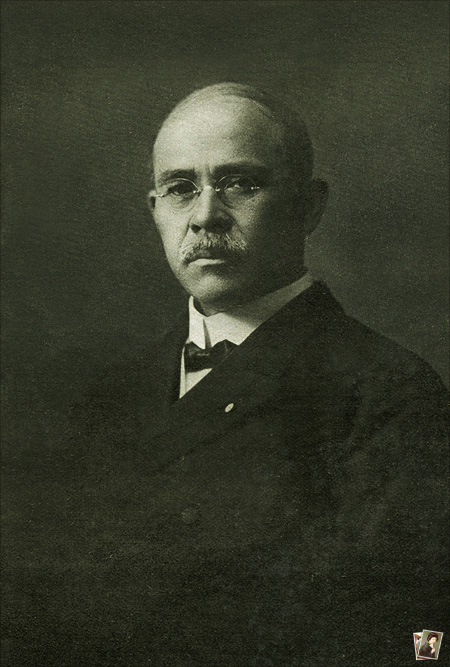
- circa 1913
- Born: 原田朝之助; September 29, 1860; Japan, Oshi Domain, Musashi Province (present Gyōda City)
- Died: September 6, 1929 (aged 68); Japan, Hiratsuka, Kanagawa
- Other names: Ogawa Kazuma, Ogawa Isshin
- Occupations: photographer, printer, and publisher

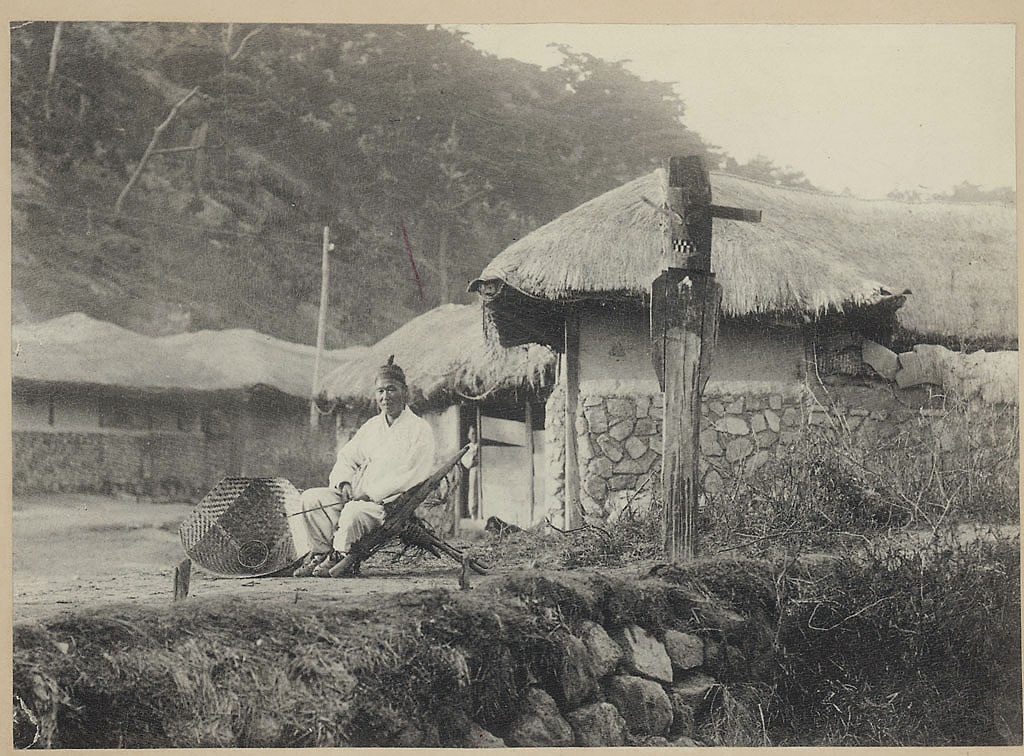
1886, photo of Korean bearer sat on his wooden pack. Image shows the design of the thatched home behind and the guardian spirit post.

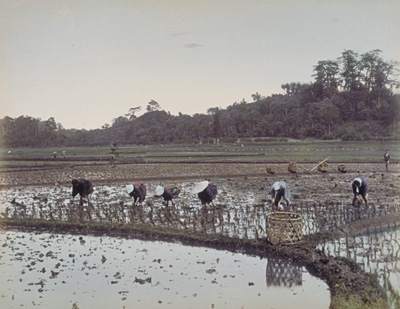
Planting rice, Japan, 19th century, hand-coloured albumen print.

Ogawa Kazumasa (小川 一眞; September 29, 1860 – September 6, 1929), also known as Ogawa Kazuma or Ogawa Isshin, was a Japanese photographer, printer and publisher who was a pioneer in photomechanical printing and photography in the Meiji era.

== Life ==
Ogawa was born in Saitama to the Matsudaira samurai clan. He started studying English and photography at the age of 15 under Yoshiwara Hideo, then in 1880, he moved to Tokyo in order to further hone his English language skills. One year later, Ogawa was hired as an interpreter in the Yokohama Police Department, while learning photography from Shimooka Renjō in Yokohama.

In 1882, he moved to Boston where he took courses in portrait photography and the dry plate process. He also studied collotype printing in Albert Type Company.

Upon his return to Japan in 1884, Ogawa opened a photographic studio in Iidabashi (Kōjimachi), the first in Tokyo. Four years later, he established the Tsukiji Kampan Seizō Kaisha (築地乾板製造会社 Tsukiji dry plate manufacturing company), which manufactured dry plates for use by photographers. In 1889, he set up Japan's first collotype business, the Ogawa Shashin Seihan jo (小川写真製版所), also referred to as the K. Ogawa printing factory. In the same year, Ogawa worked as an editor for Shashin Shinpō (写真新報, lit. Photography journal), the only photographic journal available at the time, as well as for Kokka magazine (国華, lit. National flower). He printed both magazines using the collotype printing process.

In 1886 he travelled to Seoul in Korea and to Incheon. He photographed scenes of cityscapes, palaces and everyday life. These are uncoloured images and illustrate the progress in his techniques.

In 1888, Ogawa joined Okakura Kakuzō, Kuki Ryuichi, and Ernest Fenollosa as part of the Kinki Treasure Survey, an expedition commissioned by the Imperial Household to survey works of art held in temples throughout Japan's Kinki, or Kinai, region. Ogawa served as the team's photographer and took thousands of photographs of sculpture, paintings, architecture, and decorative arts that were considered culturally significant. Many of the works surveyed would become some of Japan's first National Treasures.

Ogawa was a founding member of the Japan Photographic Society, which gathered photography amateurs from all around Japan. In 1891, he was charged with taking 100 pictures of Tokyo's most attractive geisha, to commemorate the opening of the Ryōunkaku.

In 1894, he met the writer Alicia Little who was visiting Japan from her home in China. She was already a published author and she had a diary that she had written. Ogawa supplied photographs and it was published as My Diary in a Chinese Farm. The book described their stay on a farm near the Yangtze River as they avoided the summer heat at their home in Chongqing.

Photographs taken during Kinki Treasure Survey

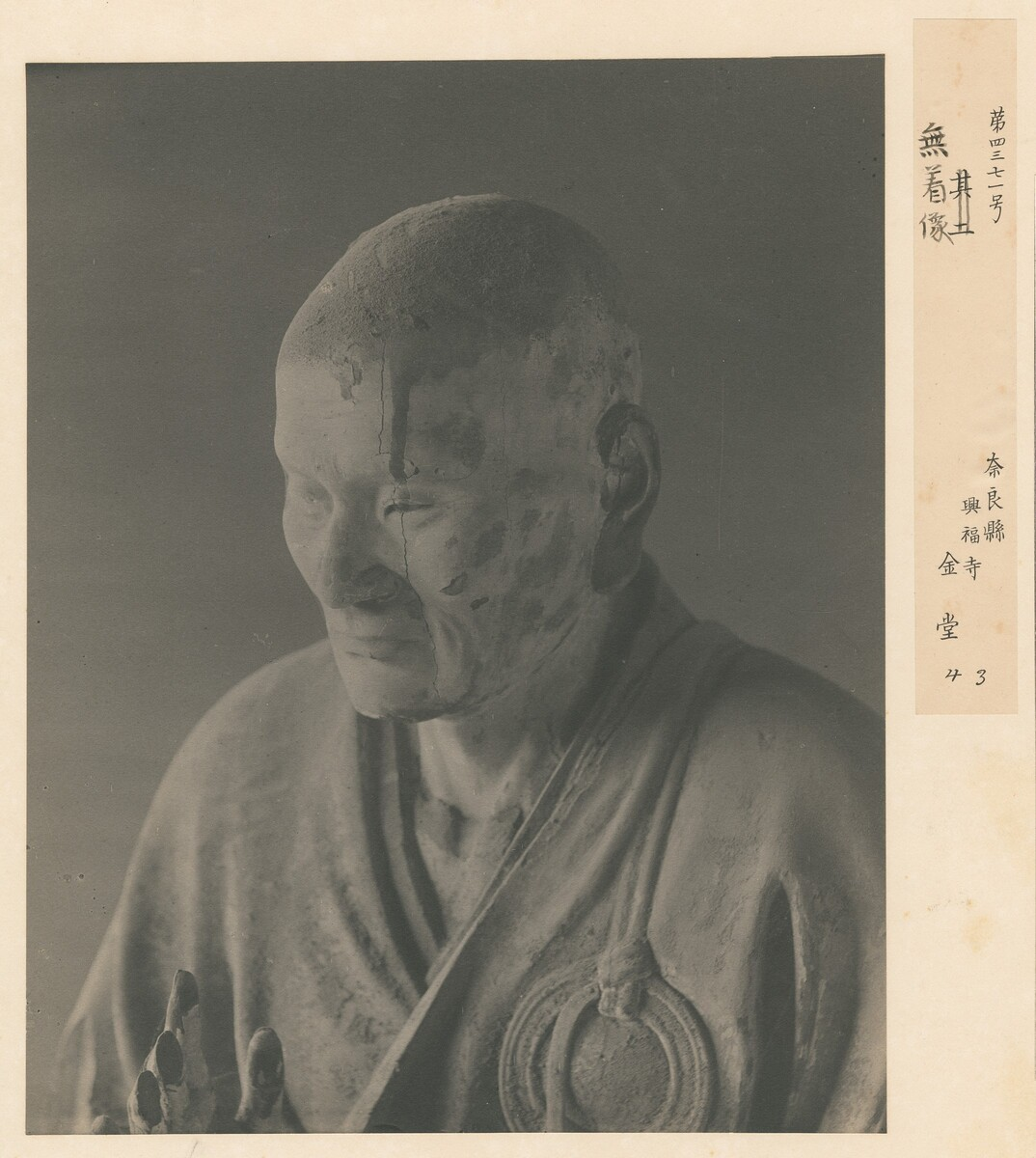
Statue of Muchaku at Kōfuku-ji, 1888/1889.

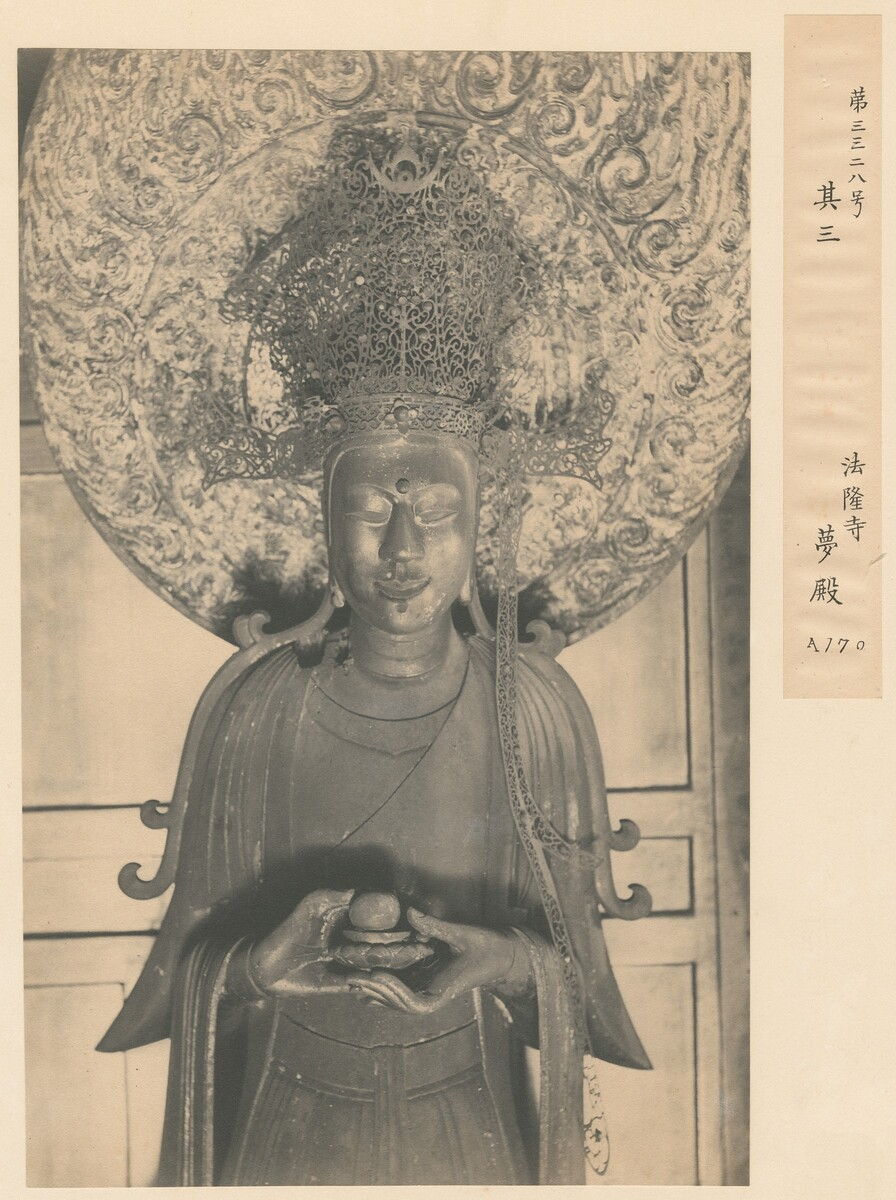
Kuse Kannon at Hōryū-ji, 1888/1889.

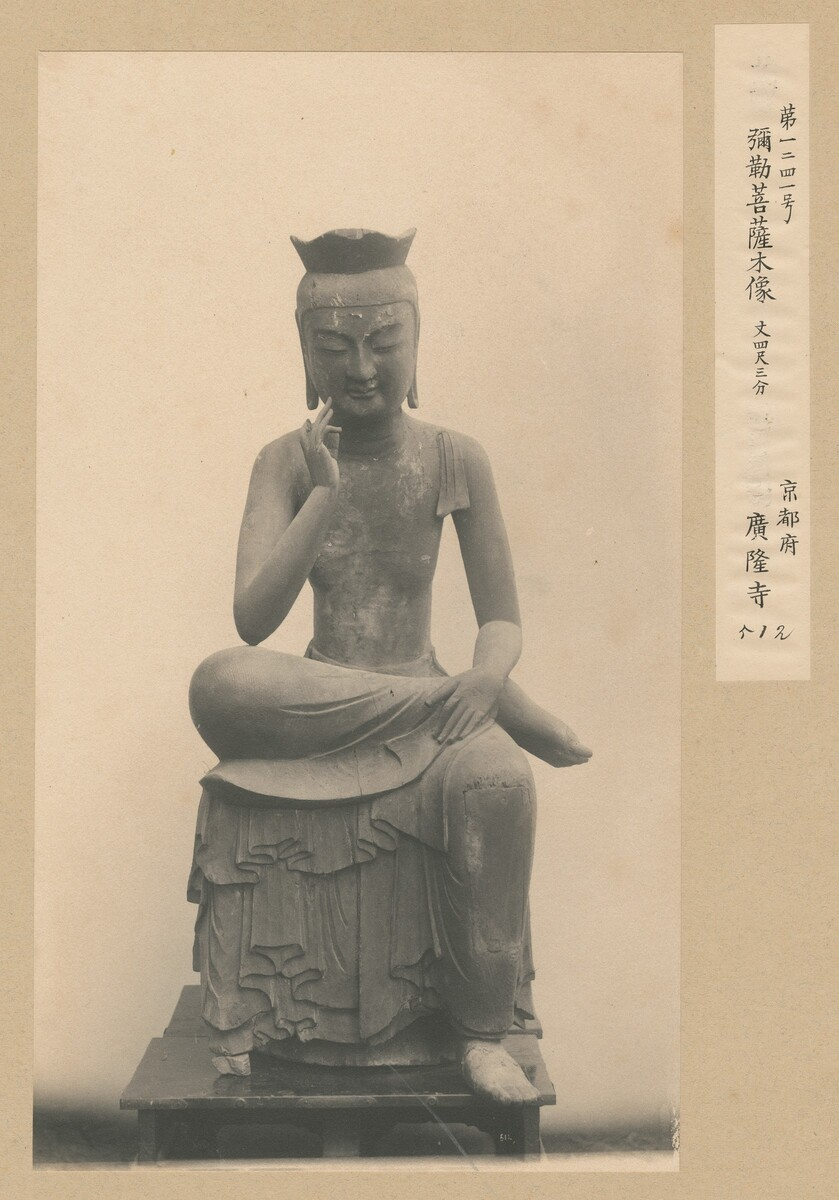
Miroku Bosatsu at Kōryū-ji, 1888/1889.

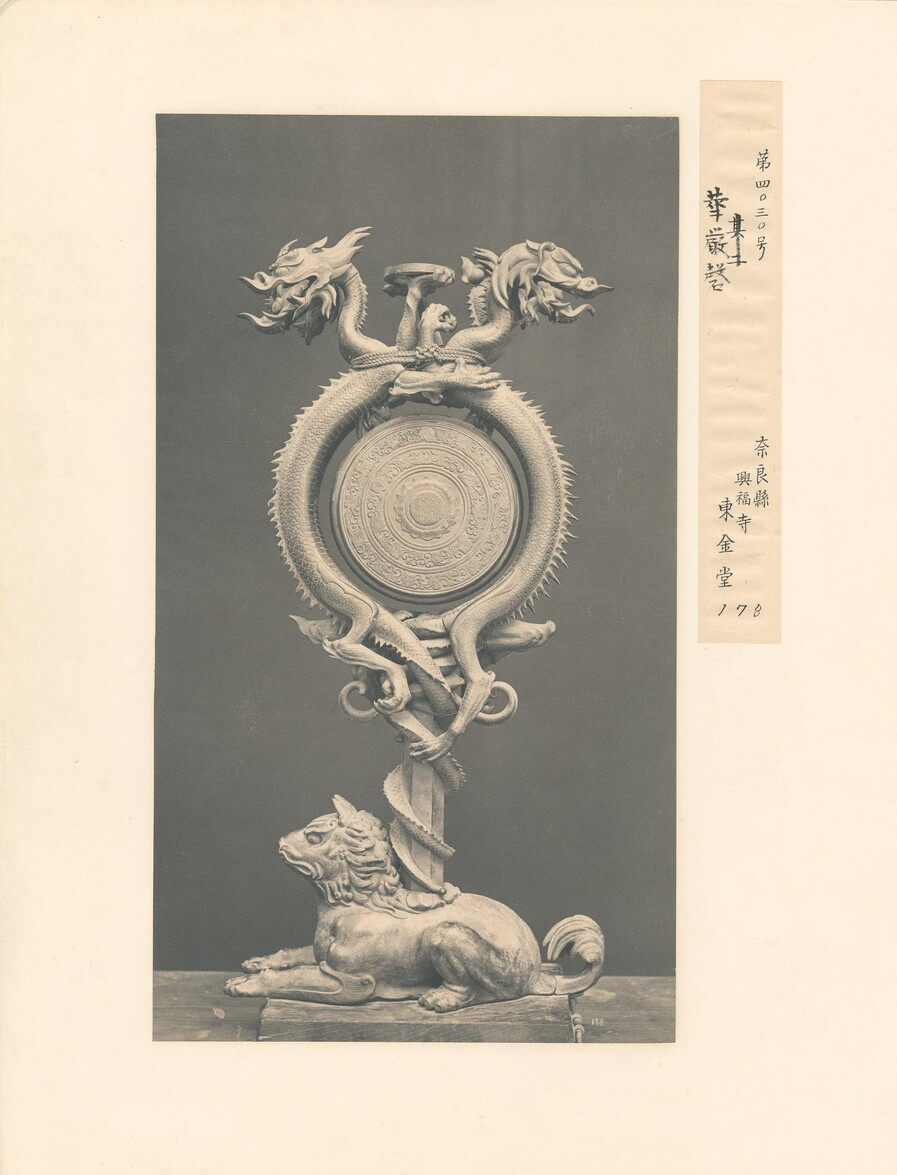
Kagenkei at Kōfuku-ji, 1888/1889.
