= Ryōunkaku =

1890–1923 Japan's first skyscraper

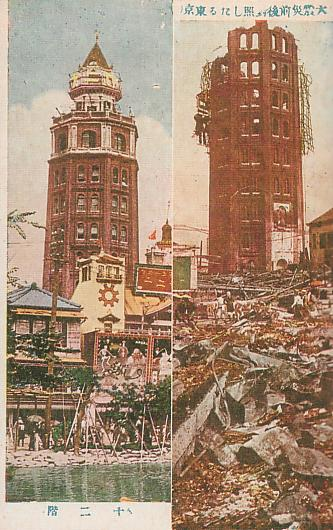
- Ryōunkaku before and after the Great Kantō earthquake
- Interactive map of the Ryōunkaku area

General information
- Coordinates: 35°42′56″N 139°47′36″E
- Opening: 11 November 1890
- Destroyed: 23 September 1923

Height
- Roof: 68.58 m (225.0 ft)

Technical details
- Floor count: 12
- Lifts/elevators: 1

Design and construction
- Architect: W. K. Burton

The Ryōunkaku (凌雲閣, Ryōunkaku; lit. Cloud-Surpassing Pavilion or Cloud-Surpassing Tower) was Japan's first Western-style skyscraper. It stood in the Asakusa district of City of Tokyo (now Taitō, Tokyo) from 1890 until its demolition in 1923 following the Great Kantō earthquake of 1923. The Asakusa Jūnikai (浅草十二階; lit. Asakusa Twelve-stories), as it was affectionately called by Tokyoites, was Tokyo's most popular attraction, and a showcase for new technologies. It housed Japan's first electric elevator.

== History ==
The Ryōunkaku quickly became a landmark and symbol of Asakusa after its opening in 1890. It was a major leisure complex for visitors from all over Tokyo. When the 1894 Tokyo earthquake weakened the structure, it was reinforced with steel girders. However on September 1, 1923, the Great Kantō earthquake destroyed the upper floors and damaged the whole tower so severely that it had to be demolished with explosives on September 23.

A supermarket stands on the former grounds of the Ryōunkaku, with a historic marker placed near its entrance. In 2018, a nearby construction project unearthed the bricks of the tower's original foundation. Once the industrial building was completed, a reproduction of an 1890 illustration of the Ryōunkaku by ukiyo-e painter Utagawa Kunimasa IV was added to its outside wall.

== Architecture and technology ==
The Ryōunkaku was designed by Scottish engineer W. K. Burton in the late 1880s, not long after his arrival in Japan. It was a 68.58-metre (225.0 ft) tall tower of red bricks over a wood frame, in renaissance revival style. All twelve floors had electric lighting. The two electric elevators were designed by Ichisuke Fujioka, a founder of Toshiba. They served the first through eighth floors, and could carry up to 10 persons each. However, for safety reasons, they were shut down after only half a year of operation.

== Usage ==
The Ryōunkaku's second through seventh floors held 46 stores selling goods from around the world. A lounge was on the eighth floor, and art exhibitions were held on the ninth floor. The tenth through twelfth floors were observation decks from which all of Tokyo could be seen, and on clear days, Mount Fuji. Many artistic and cultural events were held in the Ryōunkaku, including Western music concerts, geisha photograph exhibitions, and beauty contests. A well-known store was the place where wood-block prints were made for Sugoroku, a popular Japanese board game.

== In literature ==
As the Ryōunkaku's fame spread, it appeared in the works of contemporary authors such as Tanizaki Junichiro, Ishikawa Takuboku, Kitahara Hakushu and Kaneko Mitsuharu. The edifice's opening was commemorated in Ogawa Kazumasa's most famous work, Types of Japan, Celebrated Geysha of Tokyo in Collotype and From Photographic Negatives Taken by Him, published around 1892.

== Gallery ==
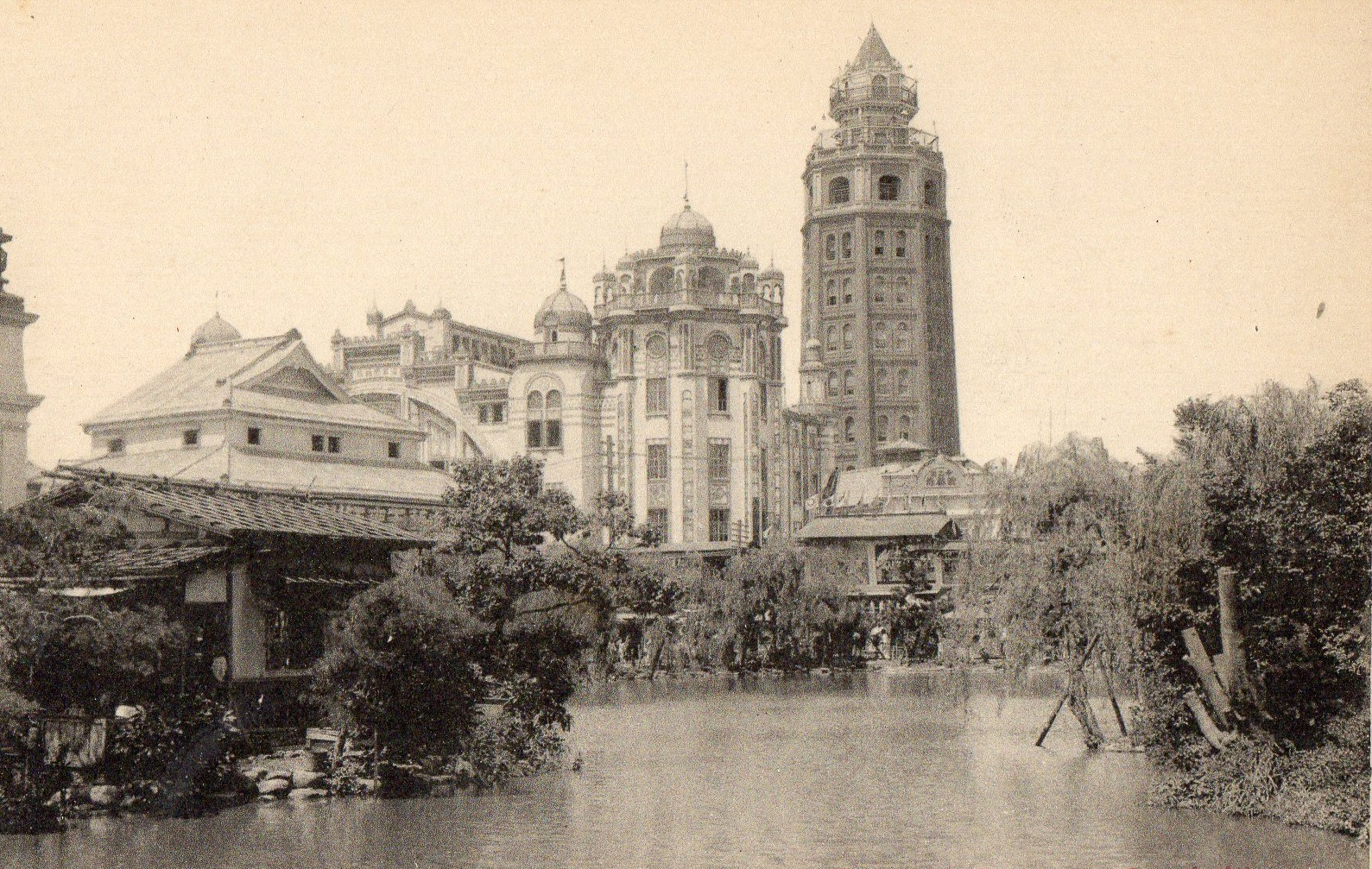
Ryōunkaku and surrounding area

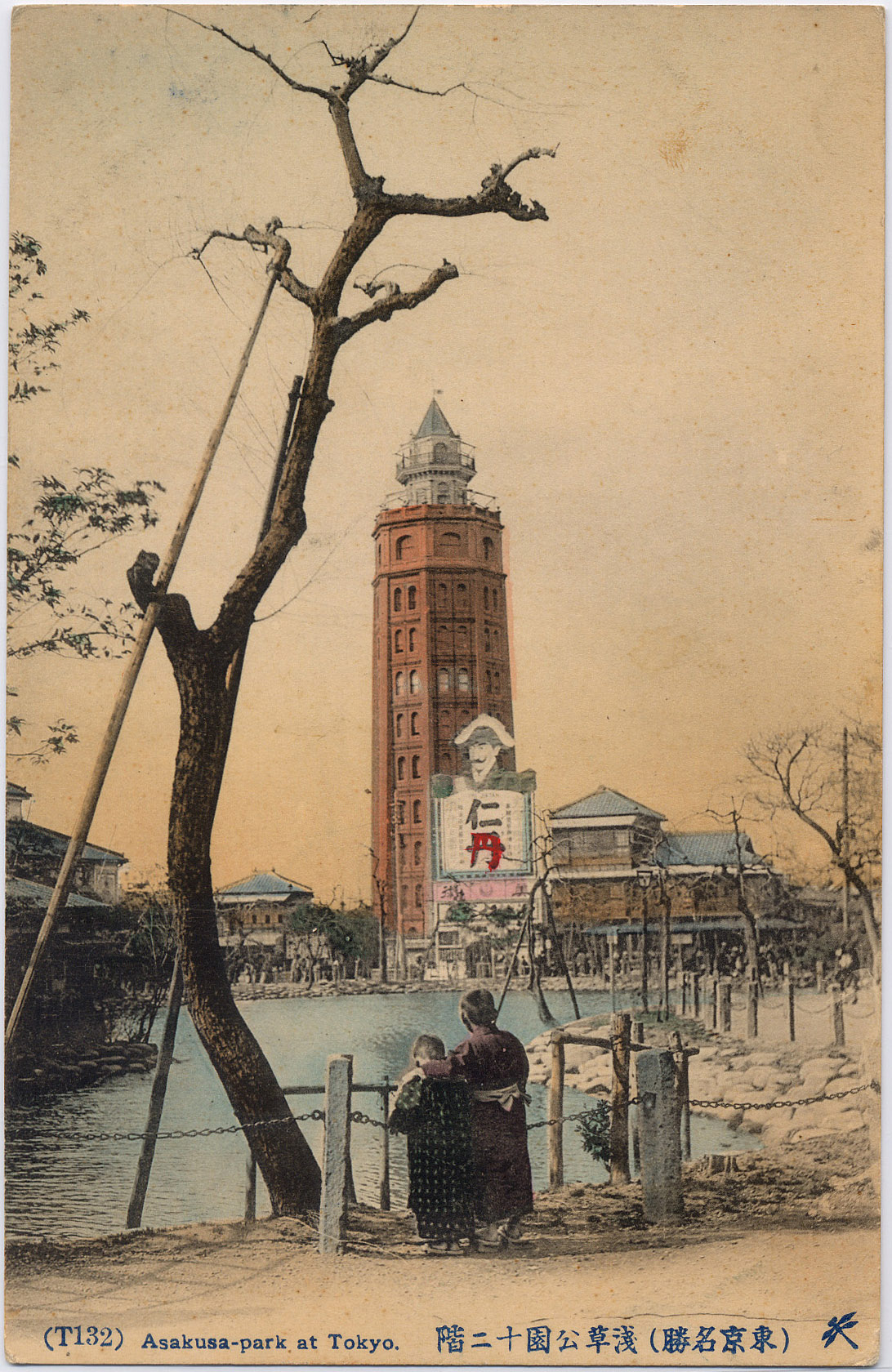
Ryōunkaku with Jintan billboard

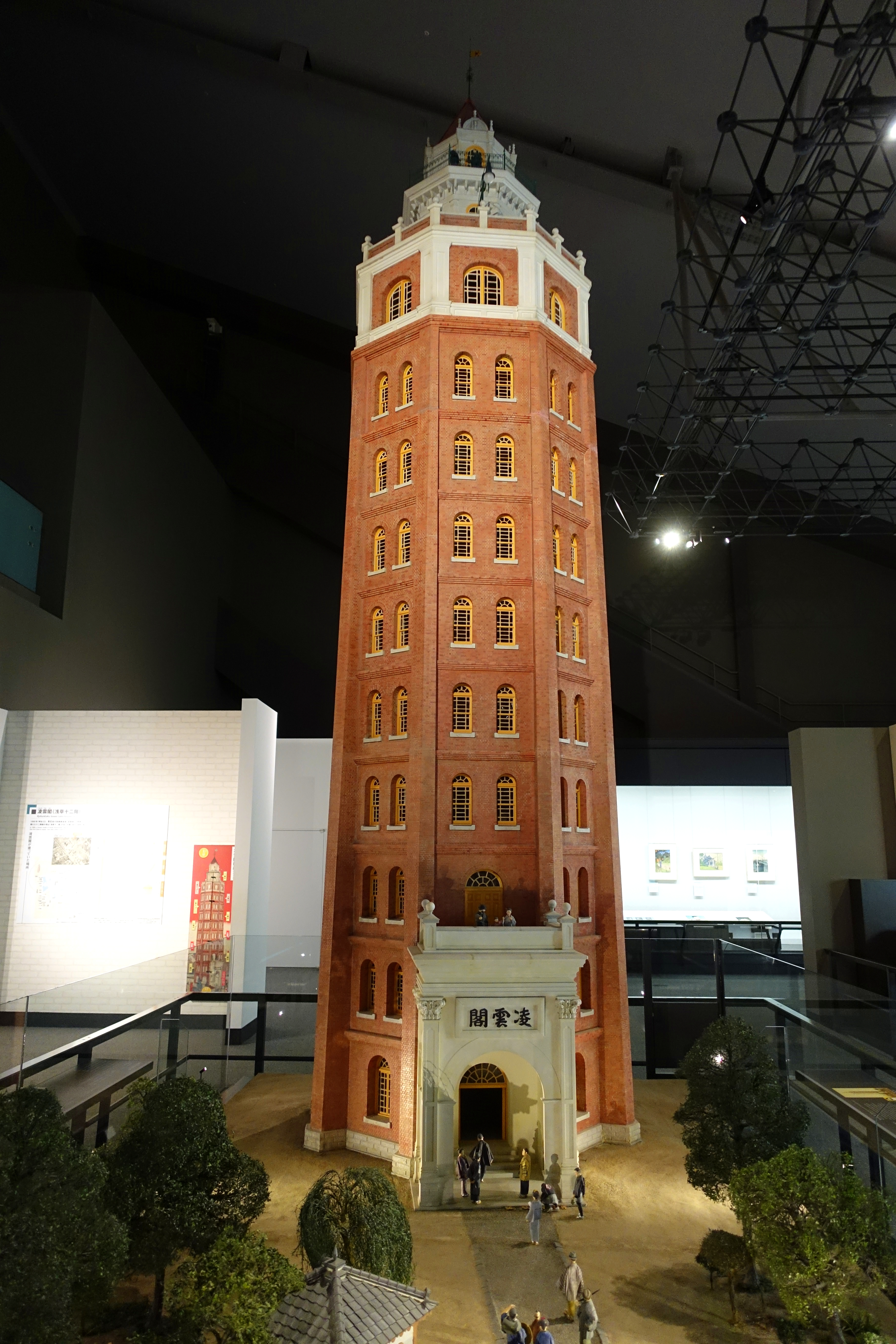
Architectural model of the tower at Edo-Tokyo Museum

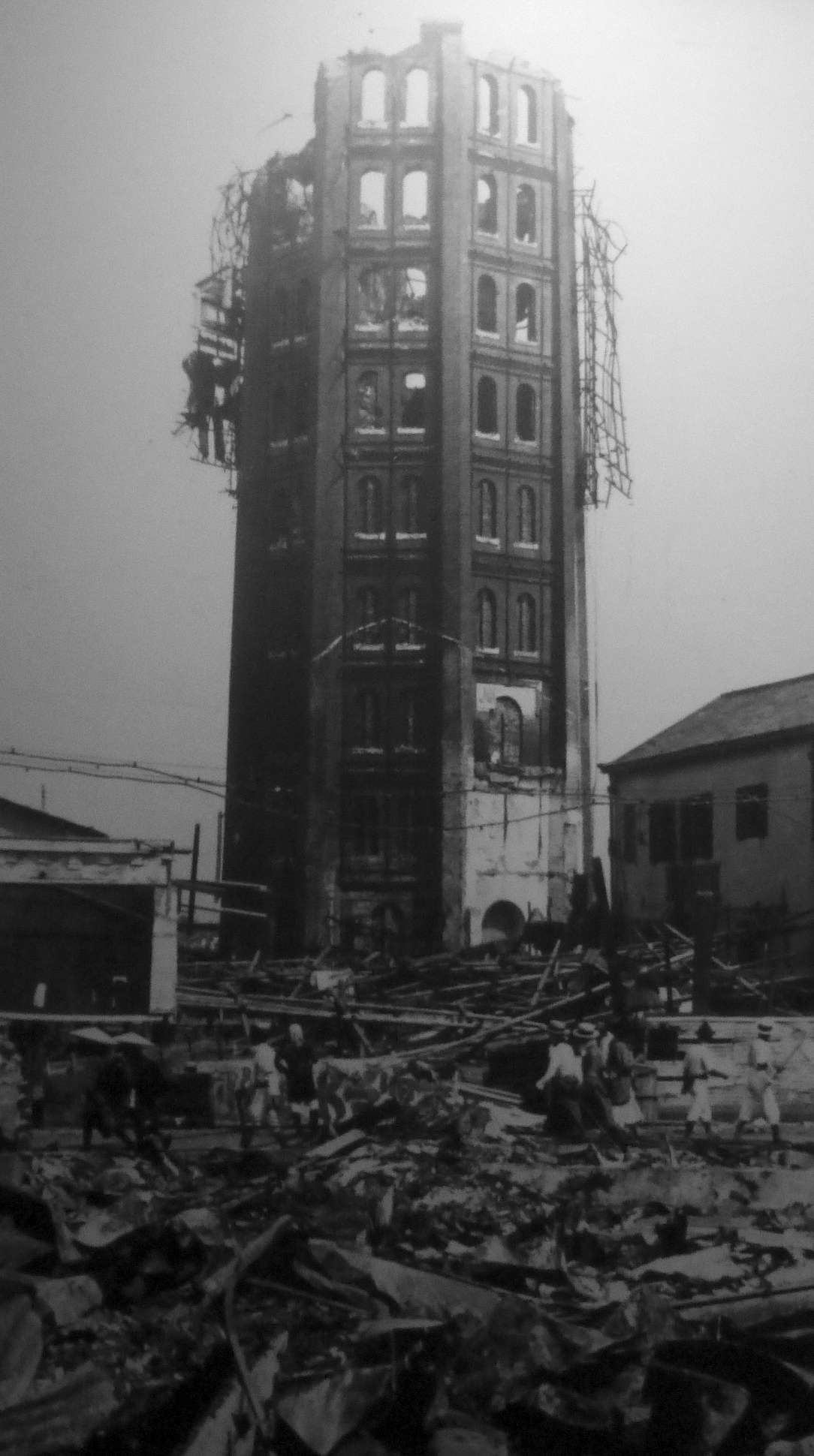
After the earthquake
