= The Scot Abroad =

Book by John Hill Burton

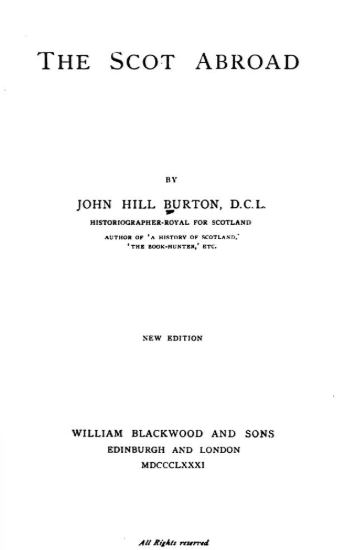
- Title page for The Scot Abroad (1864)
- Author: John Hill Burton
- Language: English
- Genre: Non-fiction
- Publication date: 1864

The Scot Abroad is a book by John Hill Burton. Published in 1864, the book consists of two volumes. The first volume deals with relations between Scotland and France; the second deals with more general topics.
