= Spalding Club =

The Spalding Club was the name of three successive antiquarian and text publication societies founded in Aberdeen, which published scholarly editions of texts and archaeological studies relevant to the history of Aberdeenshire and its region. The clubs were named after the 17th-century historian John Spalding.

== First club ==
The original club was founded by Joseph Robertson (1810–1866) in 1839, and included among its members Cosmo Innes and John Stuart. Stuart served as secretary and was editor of many of the works published. 38 quarto volumes appeared in the club's main numbered series, as well as another six volumes uniform with but not part of that series. Its last volume appeared in 1871. Seventeen of these volumes were edited by John Stuart: his more important works included Sculptured Stones of Scotland (1856 and 1867), a highly valued work of antiquarian reference; and The Book of Deer (1869), an edition of an important manuscript Gospel Book held at one time at the abbey of Deer.

== Second club ==
The New Spalding Club was founded at Aberdeen in 1886. Its founders included Alexander Forbes Irvine FRSE. It published 45 volumes in its numbered series, and another seven uniform with but not part of that series. Its last volume appeared in 1924. The Secretary from its founding was Peter John Anderson (1853–1926), Librarian of the University of Aberdeen.

== Third and final club ==
The Third Spalding Club was founded in 1928. It published 22 volumes, ceasing publication in 1960.
