= Thomas Dickson (antiquary) =

Scottish antiquary

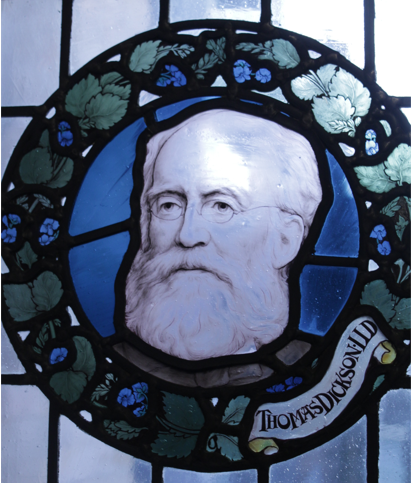
Stained glass of Dr Thomas Dickson in Scottish National Portrait Gallery

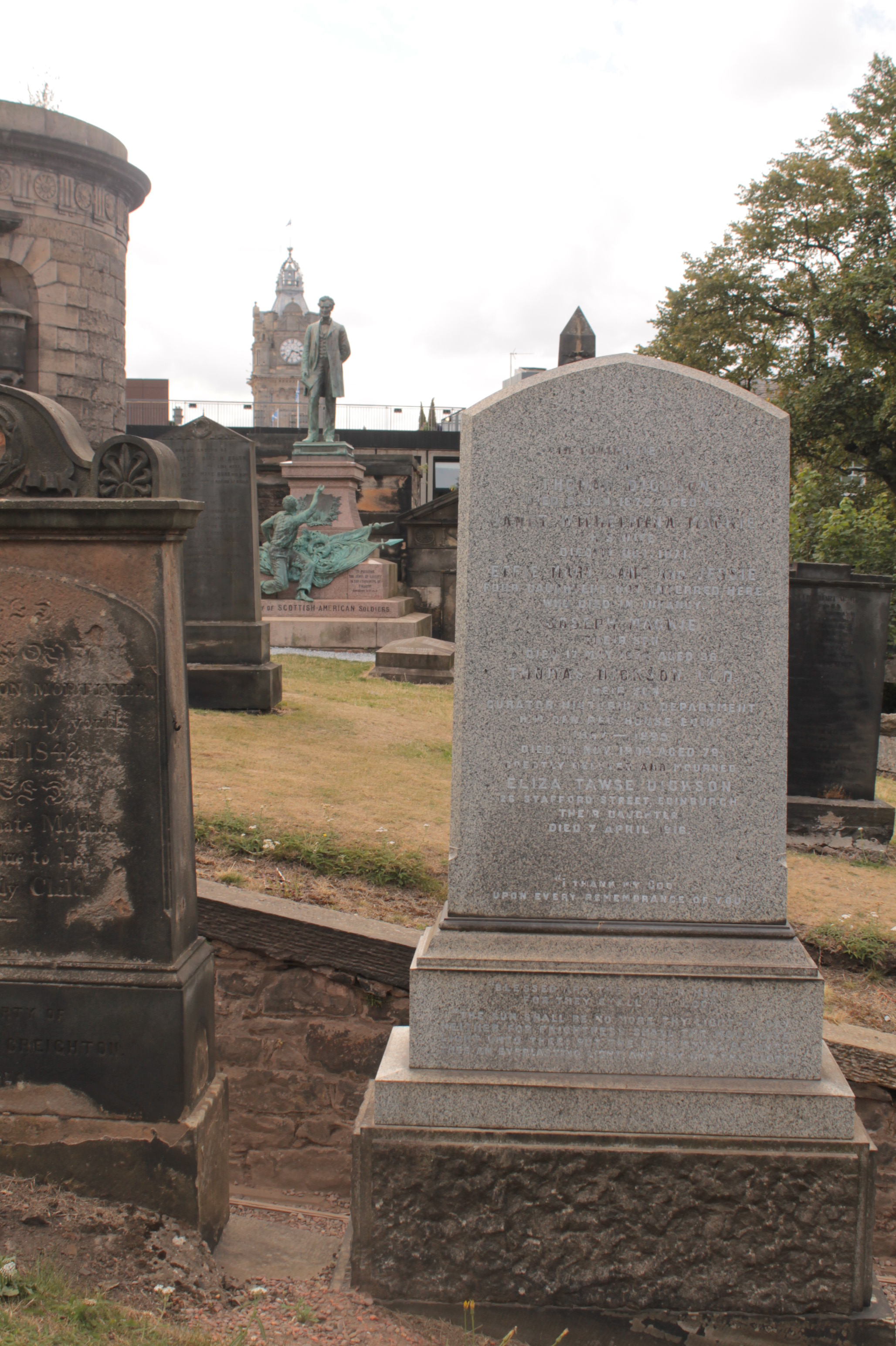
The grave of Thomas Dickson, Old Calton Burial Ground

Thomas Dickson (1825–1904) was a Scottish antiquary, genealogist and philanthropist. He was Curator of the Historical Department of General Register House in Edinburgh.

== Life ==
He was born in Edinburgh in 1825 one of seven children of Thomas Dickson and his wife, Janet Wilhelmina Mackie.

He initially trained as a minister of the Free Church of Scotland, but a throat infection damaged his voice, rendering him unable to preach. In 1859 he obtained an appointment as Principal Assistant in the Advocates Library in Edinburgh. In 1867 he succeeded Joseph Robertson as Curator of Register House in Edinburgh.

In 1886 he was awarded an honorary doctorate (LLD) from Edinburgh University.

In 1890 he was living at 26 Stafford Street in Edinburgh's West End. In the 1890s (having no family) he appears to have donated a large sum of money and his collection of antiquities to the Scottish Museum of Antiquities on Queen Street, and as such is portrayed (with other donors) in the memorial window on the east staircase.

He died on 16 November 1904. His obituary in the minutes of the Scottish Society of Antiquaries was written by James Balfour Paul.

== Artistic recognition ==
He is remembered both in the memorial window on the south stair of the Scottish National Portrait Gallery by William Graham Boss and in a portrait by William Gordon Burn-Murdoch held by the National Portrait Gallery.
