= Thomas Thomson (advocate) =

Scottish advocate, antiquarian and archivist

Thomas Thomson FRSE FSA Scot (10 November 1768 – 2 October 1852) was a Scottish advocate, antiquarian and archivist who served as Principal Clerk of Session (1828–1852) and as secretary of the literary section of the Royal Society of Edinburgh (1812–20).

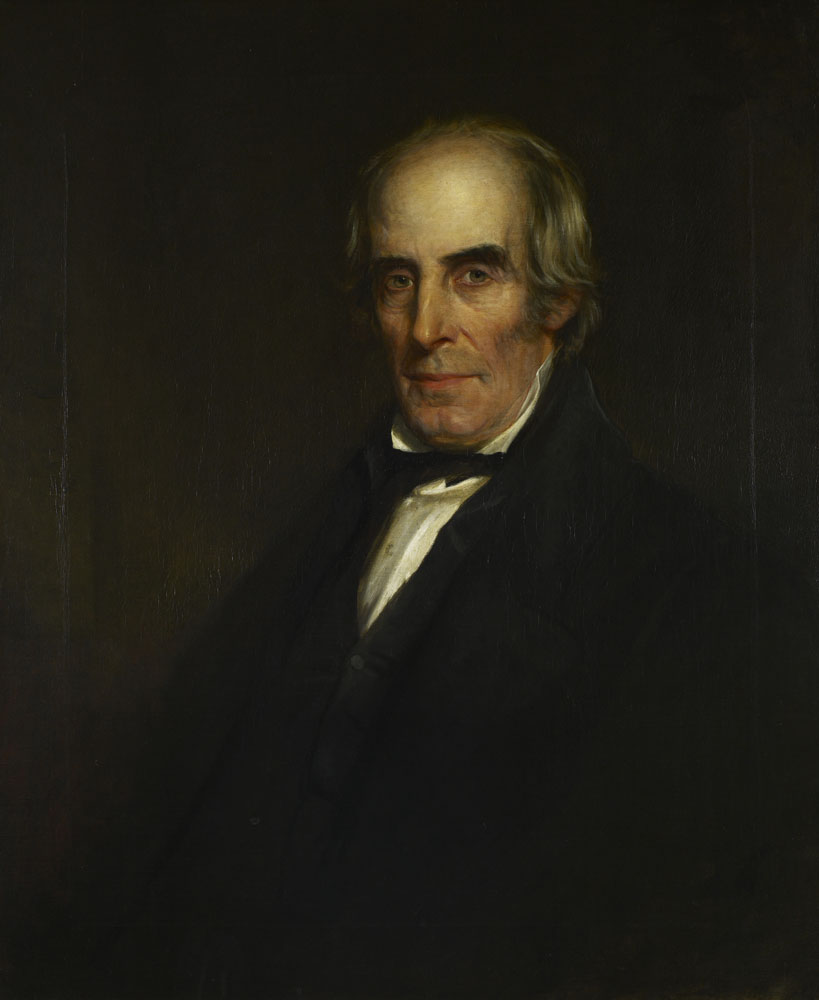
Thomas Thomson, a portrait by Robert Scott Lauder

== Life ==
Thomas Thomson was born in Dailly manse on 10 November 1768, the eldest son of Rev Thomas Thomson, minister of Dailly in Ayrshire, and his second wife, Mary, daughter of Francis Hay. John Thomson was a younger brother. After attending the parish school of Dailly, he entered the University of Glasgow at age 13, where he graduated with an MA on 27 April 1789. He attended classes in theology and law at the University of Edinburgh from 1789 to 1791. He passed the Scottish bar as an advocate on 10 December 1793.

His early Edinburgh address was 19 North Castle Street. Here he was a neighbour and close friend to Walter Scott, at that time also a fellow advocate.

Thomson acquired a practice at the bar, particularly in cases demanding legal learning. Legal and historical antiquities later absorbed his attention. His main role was deputy clerk-register of Scotland, a new post to which he was appointed on 30 June 1806. His work mainly consisted of reforming the system of public registries and the method of the custody of records, in rendering these records accessible to research, in rescuing and repairing old records, and in editing the acts of the Scottish parliament and other governmental records under the authority of the Record Commission.

In 1807 he was elected a Fellow of the Royal Society of Edinburgh. His proposers were John Playfair, Sir James Hall and Thomas Allan. He served as Secretary to the Society from 1812 to 1820.

In February 1828 Thomson was chosen one of the principal clerks of the court of session. On the institution of the Bannatyne Club in 1823 he had been chosen vice-president, and on the death of Scott in 1832 he succeeded as president. Thomson, however, was lax on finance. After an inquiry into the accounts of the register office in 1839 he was removed from the office of deputy clerk-register. At this time he was living at 127 George Street in Edinburgh.

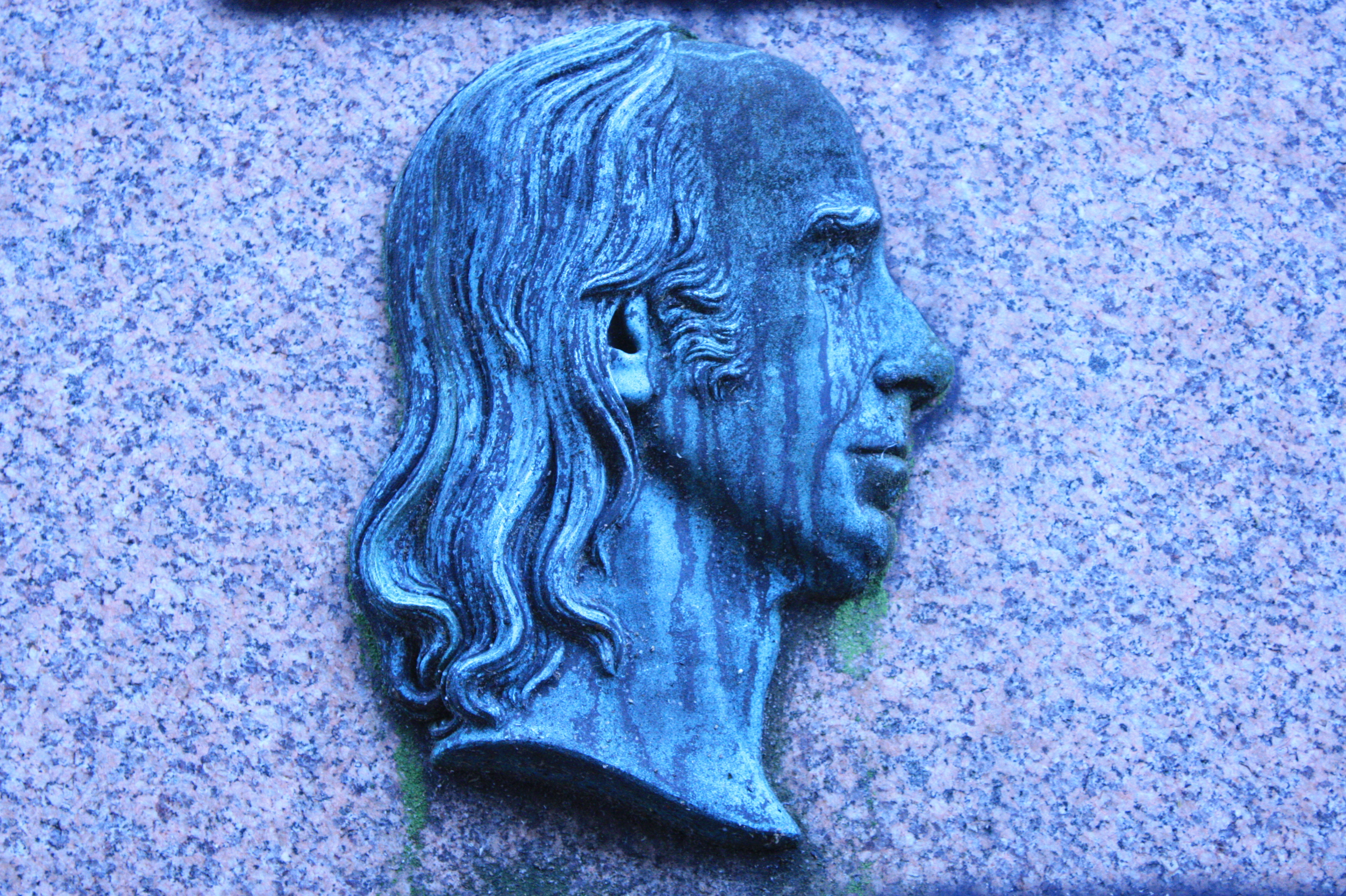
Medallion head of Thomas Thomson in Dean Cemetery

Thomson died at Shrub Hill House, Leith Walk, Edinburgh, on 2 October 1852. He is buried in Dean Cemetery in the section known as "Lord's Row".

He was succeeded as Principal Clerk of Session by Cosmo Innes.

== Family ==
In 1836 he married Anne Reed.

== Works ==
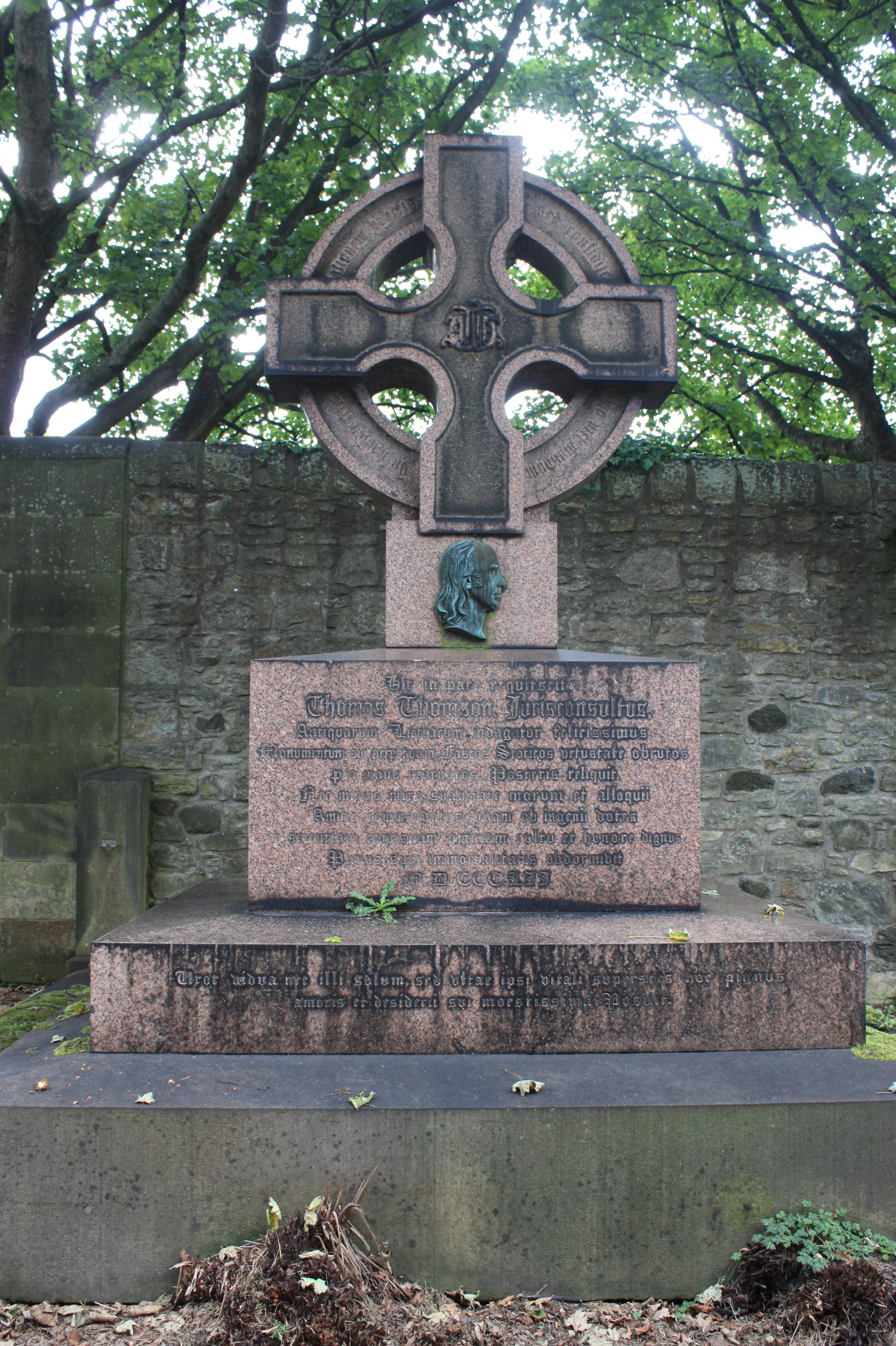
The grave of Thomas Thomson, Dean Cemetery

For research in the register office Thomson prepared some manuals:

- "A Continuation of the Retours of Service to the Chancery Office from the Union, A.D. 1707"
- "An Abbreviate or Digest of the Registers of Sasines, General and Particular, arranged in Counties with relative Indexes, from the 1st of January 1781"
- "An Abbreviate of Adjudications from 1st January 1781 to 1830"
- "An Abbreviate of Inhibitions, General and Particular, arranged in Counties, from 1st January 1781 to 1830"

His various Reports appeared from 1807. Of works published by Thomson for the Record Commission, the major one was The Acts of the Parliament of Scotland, 1424–1707, vols 2–11 (1814–1824). Vol. 1, containing the Regiam Majestatem, with the oldest recorded Proceedings and Acts of Parliament, was published last; and, although almost complete before 1841, when Thomson's connection with the register office ceased, did not appear until 1844, when it was edited, with additions, by Cosmo Innes.

Other works published under the authority of the Record Commission were:

- Inquisitionum ad Capellam Domini Regis Retornatarum, quæ in Publicis Archivis Scotiæ adhuc servantur, Abbreviatio (1811, 1816), 3 vols
- Registrum Magni Sigilli Regum Scotorum in Archivis Publicis asservatum, mcccvi–mccccxxiv (1814)
- The Acts of the Lords Auditors of Causes and Complaints, mcccclxvi–mccccxciv (1839)
- the Acts of the Lords of Council in Civil Causes, mcccclxxviii–mccccxcv (1839)

Other related works mainly derived from the same sources, were:

- A Compilation of the Forms of Process in the Court of Session during the earlier periods after its establishment, with the Variations which they have since undergone (Edinburgh, 1839)
- A Collection of Inventories and other Records of the Royal Wardrobe and Jewel House, and of the Artillery and Munition in some of the Royal Castles, 1488–1606 (Edinburgh, 1815)
- Chamberlain Rolls, vols 1–2, 1326–1406 (1817); vol. 3, 1406–1459 (1845, for the Bannatyne Club)

Thomson also edited the Memoirs of Sir George Mackenzie (Edinburgh, 1821); and Memoirs of the Lives and Characters of the Right Honourable George Baillie of Jerviswood, and of Lady Grissell, by their Daughter, Lady Murray (Edinburgh, 1822); and he published:

- Inventory of Work done for the State by his Majesty's Printer in Scotland, December 1642–October 1647 (Edinburgh, 1815), on Evan Tyler
- Ane Addicioun of Scottis Cronikles and Deidis. A Short Chronicle of the Reign of James the Second, King of Scots. From Asloan's Manuscript in the Auchinleck Library (Edinburgh, 1819)
- Menu de la Maison de la Royne faict par Mons. de Pinguillon, MDLXII (Edinburgh, 1824)

For the Bannatyne Club he also edited:

- Alexander Myln. Vitæ Dunkeldensis Ecclesiæ Episcoporum (1823)
- Discours particulier d'Escosse, escrit en 1559 (1824)
- The History and Life of King James the Sext (1825)
- Memoirs of his own Life by Sir James Melville of Halhill (1827)
- Memoirs of his own Life and Times by Sir James Turner (1829)
- The History of Scotland, by John Lesley, bishop of Ross (1830)
- Collection of Ancient Scottish Prophecies in Alliterative Verse (1833)
- Diurnal of Remarkable Occurrents from the Pollok MS (1833)
- The Ragman Rolls, 1291–1296 (1834)
- The Book of the Universal Kirk of Scotland, 1560–1618, 3 vols (1839–45)
- A Diary of the Public Correspondence of Sir Thomas Hope of Craighall (1843)
- Munimenta Vetustiora Comitatus de Mortoun, and Original Letters and Papers in the Archives of the Earls of Morton (1852)

In 1800 Thomson was chosen to edit an edition of Lord Hailes's Works. It never appeared; but the edition of Hailes's Annals and Historical Tracts (1819) acknowledged Thomson's help. A close associate of Francis Jeffrey and other projectors of the Edinburgh Review, Thomson contributed three papers (on Erasmus Darwin's Temple of Nature (1803); Anna Seward's Memories of the Past (1804); and John Mason Good's Life of Alexander Geddes (1804)); and occasionally undertook the editorship for Jeffrey.
