= Japan Photographic Society (19th century) =

Japanese photography organization

The Japan Photographic Society (日本写真会, Nihon Shashinkai) was a Tokyo-based organization of photographers founded in 1889 that continued until the closing years of the nineteenth century.

The JPS started as Japan's first organization for amateur photographers, although professionals later joined as well. Of the fifty-six founding members, twenty-four were foreigners, and among these W. K. Burton served as secretary. The JPS arranged various photographic activities: criticism, modeling sessions, exhibitions and so forth. The members' works were published in the magazine Shashin Shinpō. The society seems to have folded at some time shortly after 1896, as a result of the bankruptcy of its main sponsor, Kajima Seibei.

A later organization with the same name is unrelated.

== Sources and further reading ==
- Matsuda Takako. “Major Photography Clubs and Associations.” In Anne Wilkes Tucker, et al., The History of Japanese Photography. New Haven: Yale University Press, 2003. ISBN 0-300-09925-8. Pp. 372–3.
