= John Hill Burton =

Scottish advocate, historian and economist

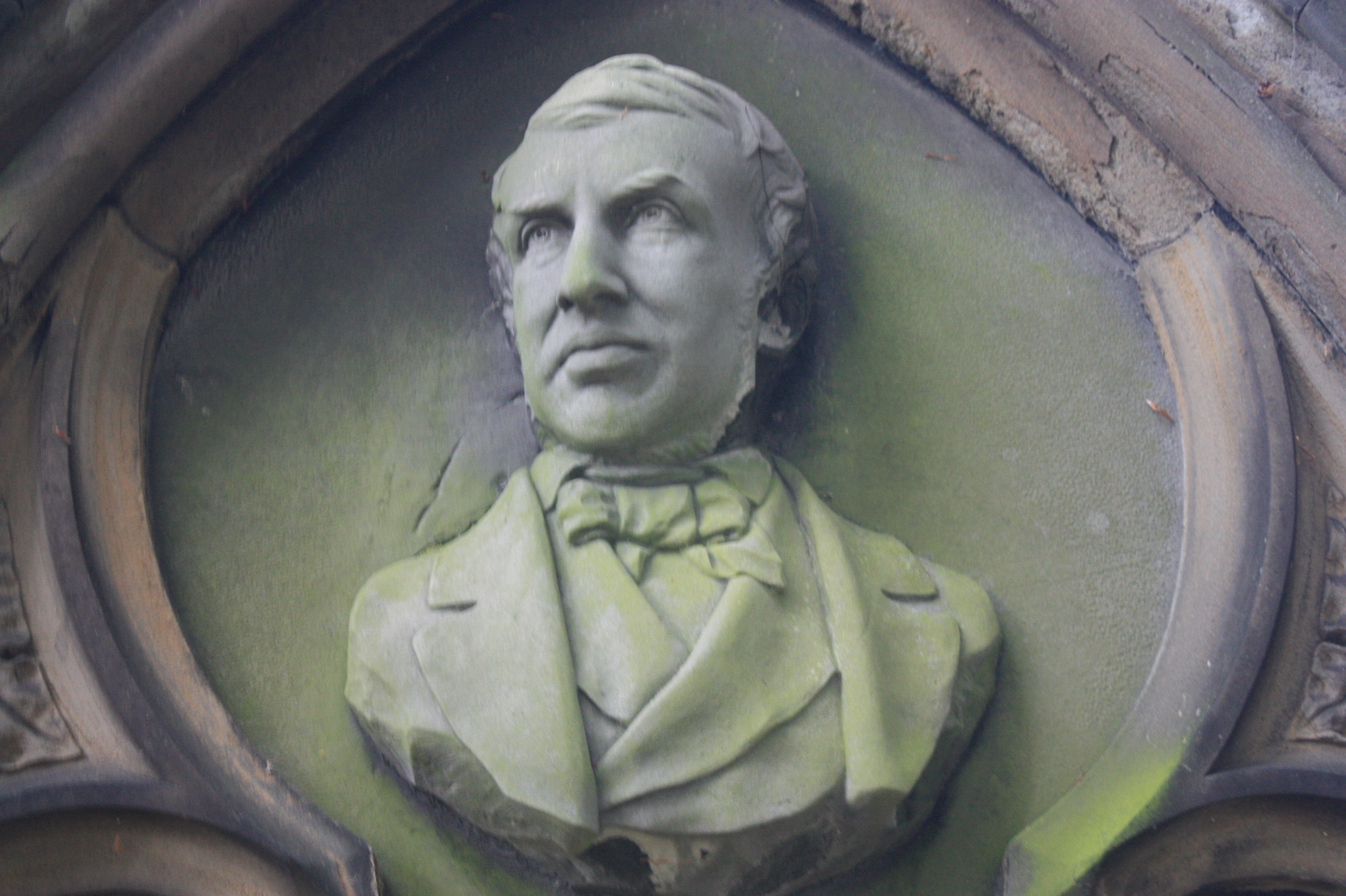
- A bust of John Hill Burton as portrayed on his wife's grave in Dean Cemetery in Edinburgh (carved by William Brodie in 1881)
- Born: 22 August 1809; Aberdeen, Scotland
- Died: 10 August 1881 (aged 71); Edinburgh, Scotland
- Occupations: Advocate; historian; economist

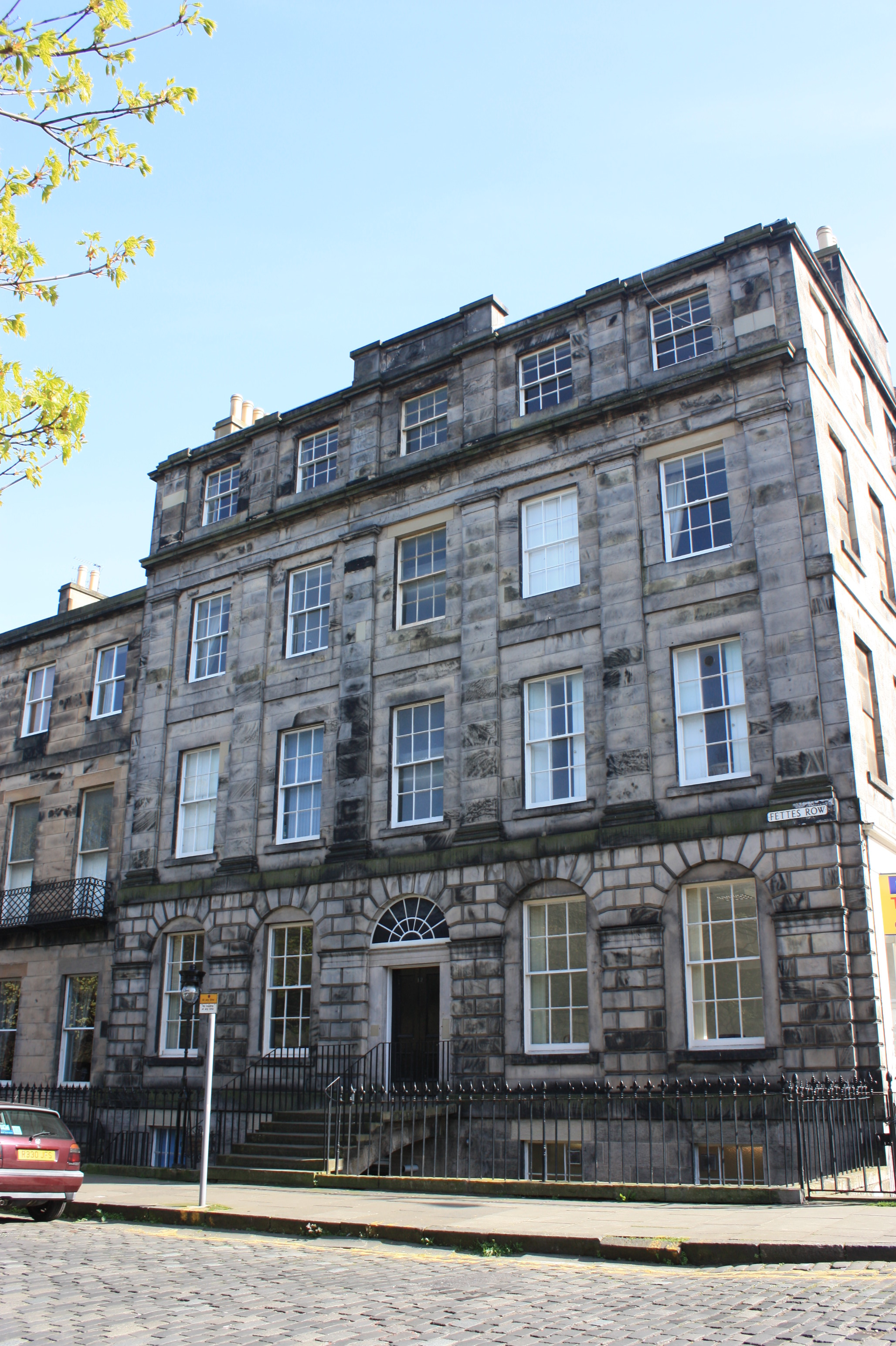
Burton's house at 12 Fettes Row, Edinburgh

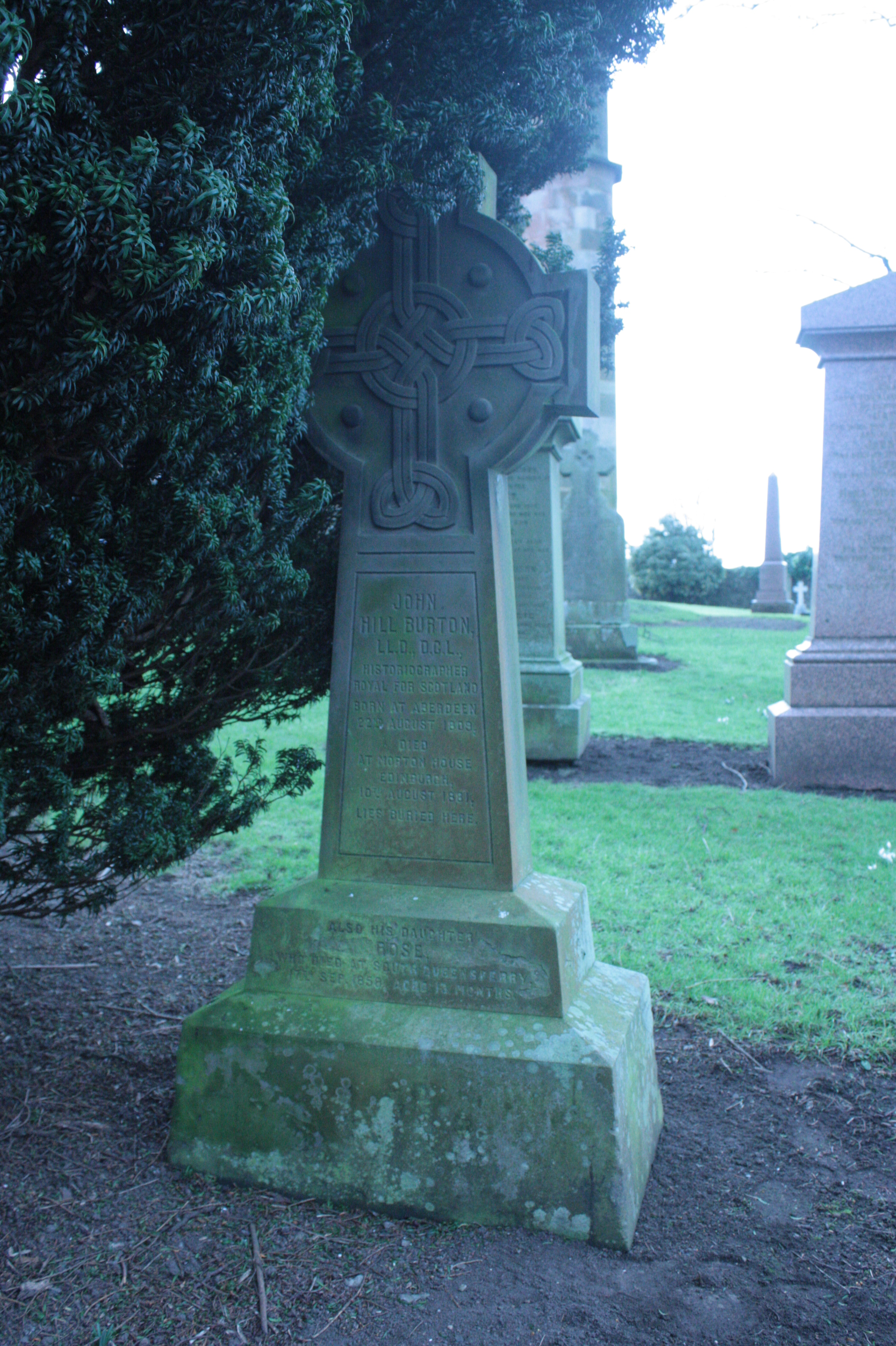
John Hill Burton's grave, Dalmeny churchyard

John Hill Burton FRSE (22 August 1809 – 10 August 1881) was a Scottish advocate, historian and economist. The author of Life and Correspondence of David Hume, he was secretary of the Scottish Prison Board (1854–1877), and Historiographer Royal (1867–1881).

== Life ==
Burton was born in Aberdeen on 22 August 1809, the son of William Kinninmont Burton (d. 1819), a lieutenant in the army, and Elizabeth (d. 1848), daughter of John Paton of Grandholm, Aberdeenshire, He was educated at Aberdeen Grammar School and Marischal College. After graduating, he moved to Edinburgh with his widowed mother and his sister, the educational reformer Mary Burton. He studied for the Bar, being admitted to the Faculty of Advocates in 1831. In 1832/3 the address of "J.H. Burton advocate" was given as 12 Fettes Row, in Edinburgh's New Town. However, he had little practice, and in 1854 was appointed Secretary to the Prison Board of Scotland, and in 1877 a Commissioner of Prisons.

He became at an early period of his life a contributor to Blackwood's Magazine and other periodicals, and in 1846 published a life of David Hume, which attracted considerable attention, and was followed by Lives of Lord Lovat and Lord President Forbes. He began his career as a historian by the publication in 1853 of History of Scotland from the Revolution to the Extinction of the last Jacobite Insurrection, to which he added (1867–70) History of Scotland from Agricola's Invasion to the Revolution, in 7 vols., thus completing a continuous narrative. Subsequently, he published a History of the Reign of Queen Anne (1880). Other works of a lighter kind were The Book-Hunter (1862), and The Scot Abroad (1864). Burton's historical works display much research and a spirit of candour and honesty, and have picturesque and spirited passages, but the style is unequal, and frequently lacks dignity. Nevertheless, he was one of the first historians to introduce the principles of historical research into the study and writing of the history of Scotland. He was appointed Historiographer Royal in 1867.

Burton died at his then home, Morton House on the southern edge of Edinburgh. He is buried in Dalmeny churchyard with his infant daughter Rose (1857–1858), to the north-east of the church, the stone cross being partly obscured by a large yew tree on its south side which screens it from the centre of the churchyard. The monument to his first wife, Isabella and their joint children is in Dean Cemetery and this bears a fine portrait head of Burton in high relief sculpted by William Brodie.

In 1901 it was publicly revealed that he supplied all the commentaries to the 240 architectural illustrations by Robert William Billings in The Baronial and Ecclesiastical Antiquities of Scotland, a work published in four volumes between 1845 and 1852, which contained 240 illustrations, with explanatory text. The work was a great success and has been reprinted several times, in 1899, 1900, 1901, 1908, 1909, 2008, 2012, 2015, 2016 and 2017.

== Family ==
On 23 July 1844, at Edinburgh, John Hill Burton married Isabella, daughter of David Lauder, a Captain in the Perthshire Militia, by his wife Janet Patrick. Isabella died in 1850, aged 40. Their daughter, Matilda Lauder "Mattie" Burton (1848–1928) married Dr William Lennox Cleland (1847–1918) on 21 June 1877. He was a noted surgeon in South Australia and for many years served as Director of Adelaide's Parkside Lunatic Asylum, and as Colonial Surgeon (South Australia).

Burton married again, in 1855, Katherine, daughter of Cosmo Innes, the antiquarian. She was an author in her own right, who gave birth the next year to engineer W. K. Burton. They had nine children in total. Another of their children, Mary Rose Hill Burton, was a notable artist. A further son, Cosmo Innes Burton (1862–1890) was a short-lived but noteworthy chemist and a Fellow of the Royal Society of Edinburgh.
