= John Stuart (antiquarian) =

Scottish genealogist

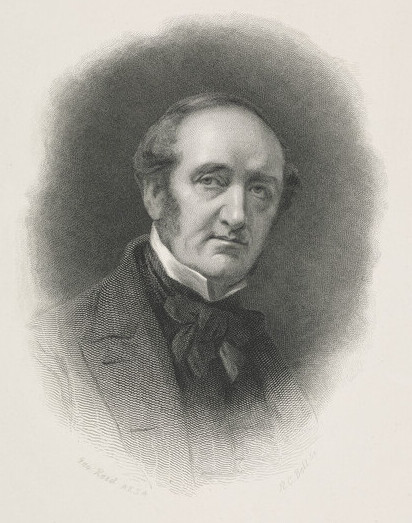
Photograph of John Stuart by Robert Charles Bell

John Stuart (1813–1877) was a Scottish antiquarian and genealogist.

== Life ==
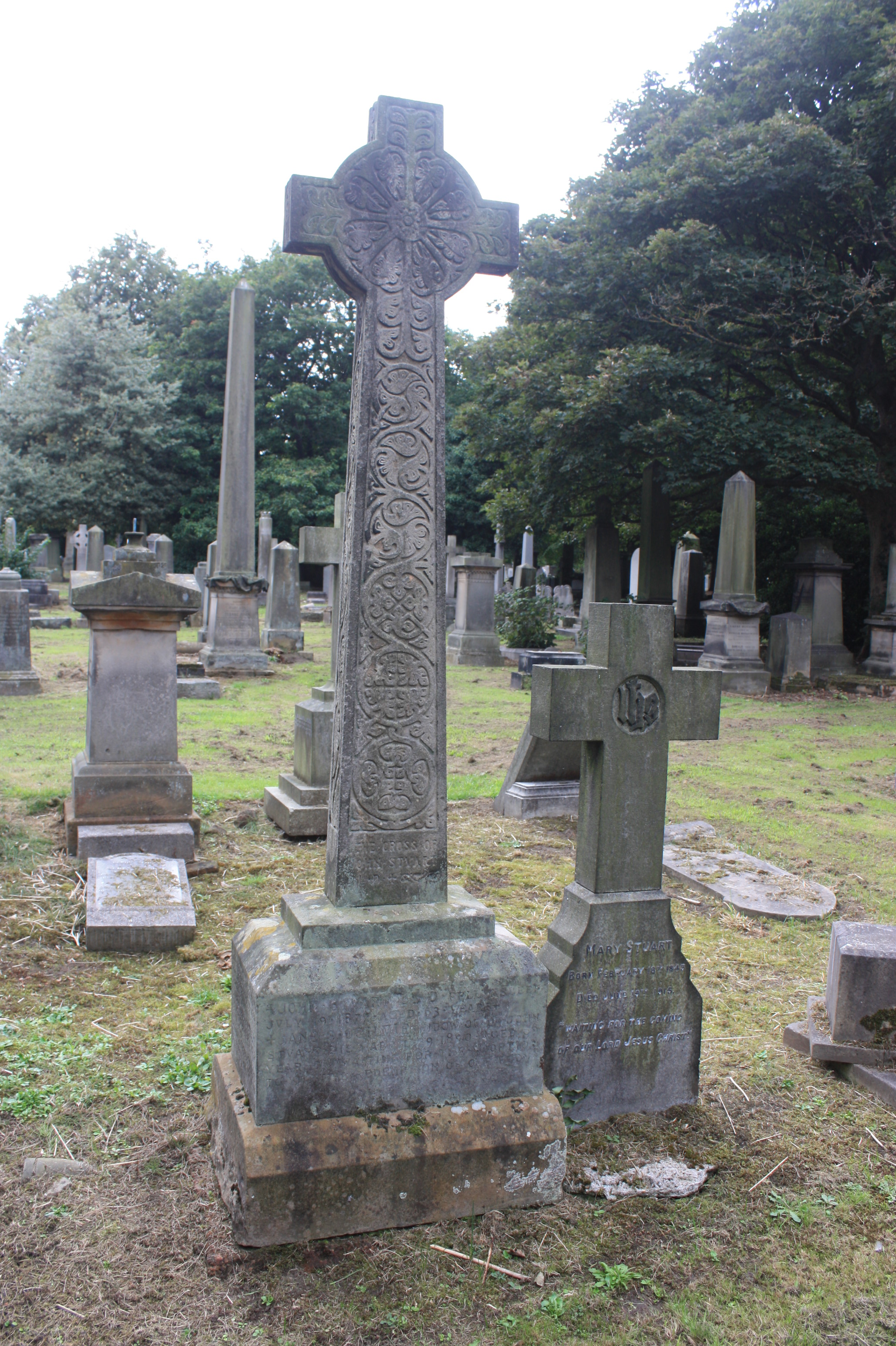
The grave of John Stuart LLD, Warriston Cemetery

Stuart was born in November 1813 at Forgue, Aberdeenshire, where his father had a small farm. He was educated at Aberdeen University, and in 1836 became a member of the Aberdeen Society of Advocates. In 1853 he was appointed one of the official searchers of records in the Register House, Edinburgh, and in 1873 became principal keeper of the register of deeds. In 1854 he was appointed secretary of the Society of Antiquaries of Scotland, and was central to its operation.

In 1839, along with Joseph Robertson (1810–1866) and Cosmo Innes, he joined the 'Spalding Club,' of which he acted as secretary till the close of its operations in 1870. Of the thirty-eight quarto volumes issued by the club, fourteen were produced under Stuart's editorship. Prominent among these were the two large folios on The Sculptured Stones of Scotland, published in 1856 and 1867, and regarded by antiquarians as one of their most important books of reference. Another of the Spalding volumes is The Book of Deer, published in 1869, a reproduction by Stuart of a manuscript copy of the Gospels which belonged to the abbey of Deer—of great historical and linguistic value, especially with regard to the Celtic history of Scotland. At the final meeting, on 23 Dec. 1870, Stuart was presented by the club with a piece of plate and his portrait, the work of Mr. (now Sir) George Reid.

In 1866 the university of Aberdeen conferred on him the degree of LL.D. He was elected an honorary member of the Royal Archaeological Institute and of the Society of Antiquaries of Zurich and the Assemblea di Storia Patria in Palermo.

He lived at Newmills in Currie on the southern edge of Edinburgh. He was twice married, and was survived by his second wife and two daughters of the first marriage. Stuart's love of study lay for the most part within a limited range. In the more general bearings of archaeology he took little interest, but in the deciphering of records and illustrations he did yeoman service.

He died on 19 July 1877 while on holiday in Ambleside. He is buried in Warriston Cemetery in Edinburgh with his wife, Jane Ogilvie. The grave lies centrally within the upper section north of the vaults.

== Works ==
Stuart contributed largely to the Transactions of the Society of Antiquaries of Scotland, especially on the subject of Scottish crannogs. Two very able papers were also given on the history of the crozier of St. Fillan, and an account of the priory of Restennet, near Forfar. For the society he edited two volumes of ancient chartularies, entitled Records of the Isle of May, 1868, and Records of the Monastery of Kinloss, 1872.

Of his researches among old family records there remains the Registrum de Panmure, two quarto volumes, printed by the Earl of Dalhousie in 1874. At the instance of the Royal Commission on Historical Manuscripts he examined the charter chests of the Scottish nobility and furnished reports. Among the records at Dunrobin Castle he discovered the original dispensation for the marriage of Bothwell and Lady Jane Gordon. This find gave Stuart the opportunity of discussing, as he did in his volume, A Lost Chapter in the History of Mary Queen of Scots (Edinburgh, 1874), the law and practice of Scotland relating to marriage dispensations in Roman Catholic times.

For the Burgh Records Society Stuart edited two volumes of Extracts from the Burgh Records of Aberdeen, 1625–1747, and he also edited an edition of Archaeological Essays of the late Sir J. Y. Simpson (1872).

Among the other works which Stuart prepared for publication by the Spalding Club were,

- Miscellanies, three volumes, published in 1841, 1842, and 1849.
- Extracts from the Presbytery Book of Strathbogie, 1631–54, published in 1843
- Extracts from the Council Register of Aberdeen, 1398–1625, 2 vols., issued in 1844–9
- Memorialls of the Trubles in Scotland and England from 1624 to 1645, printed in 1850–1851
- Notices of the Spalding Club, prepared in 1871 as a record of its labours.

In addition to the works mentioned, Stuart edited for the Spalding Club:

- A brieffe narration of the services done to three noble ladyes, by Gilbert Blakhal, 1844.
- Selections from the Records of the Kirk Session, Presbytery, and Synod of Aberdeen from 1562 to 1681, 1846.
- Memoir of the late A. H. Rhind of Sibster, Edinburgh, 1864, 8vo. A biographical sketch of Alexander Henry Rhind.
