= Cosmo Innes =

Scottish judge and historian (1798–1874)

Cosmo Nelson Innes FRSE
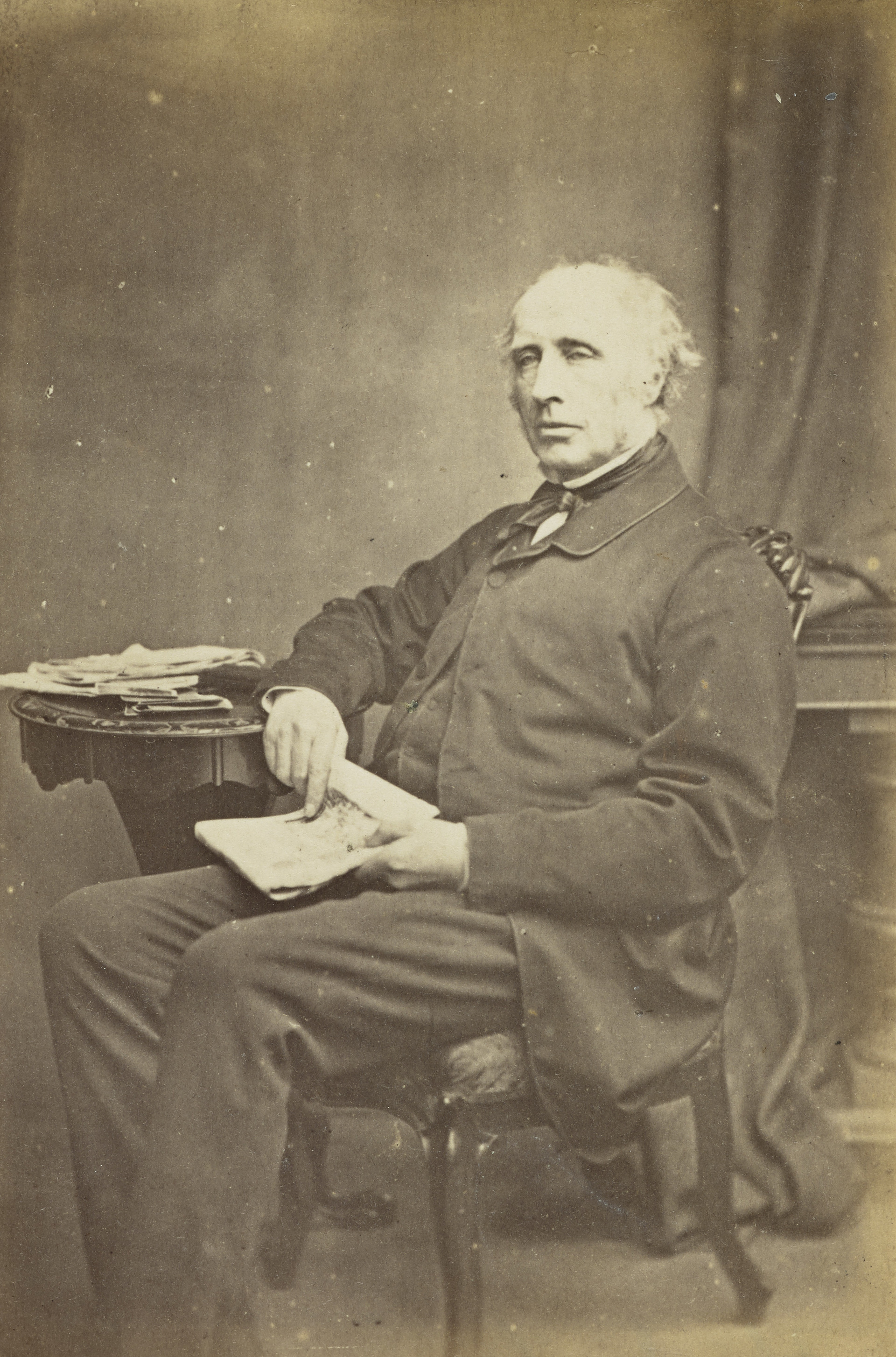
- Born: 9 September 1798
- Died: 31 July 1874 (aged 75)
- Burial place: Warriston Cemetery, Edinburgh
- Education: Edinburgh High School
- Alma mater: University of Edinburgh
- Occupations: Advocate, judge, historian and antiquary
- Parents: John Innes (father); Euphemia Russell (mother)

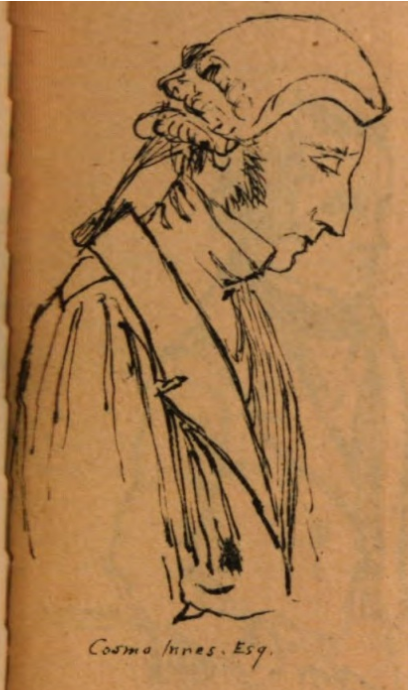
Court sketch of Cosmo Innes, drawn in 1838

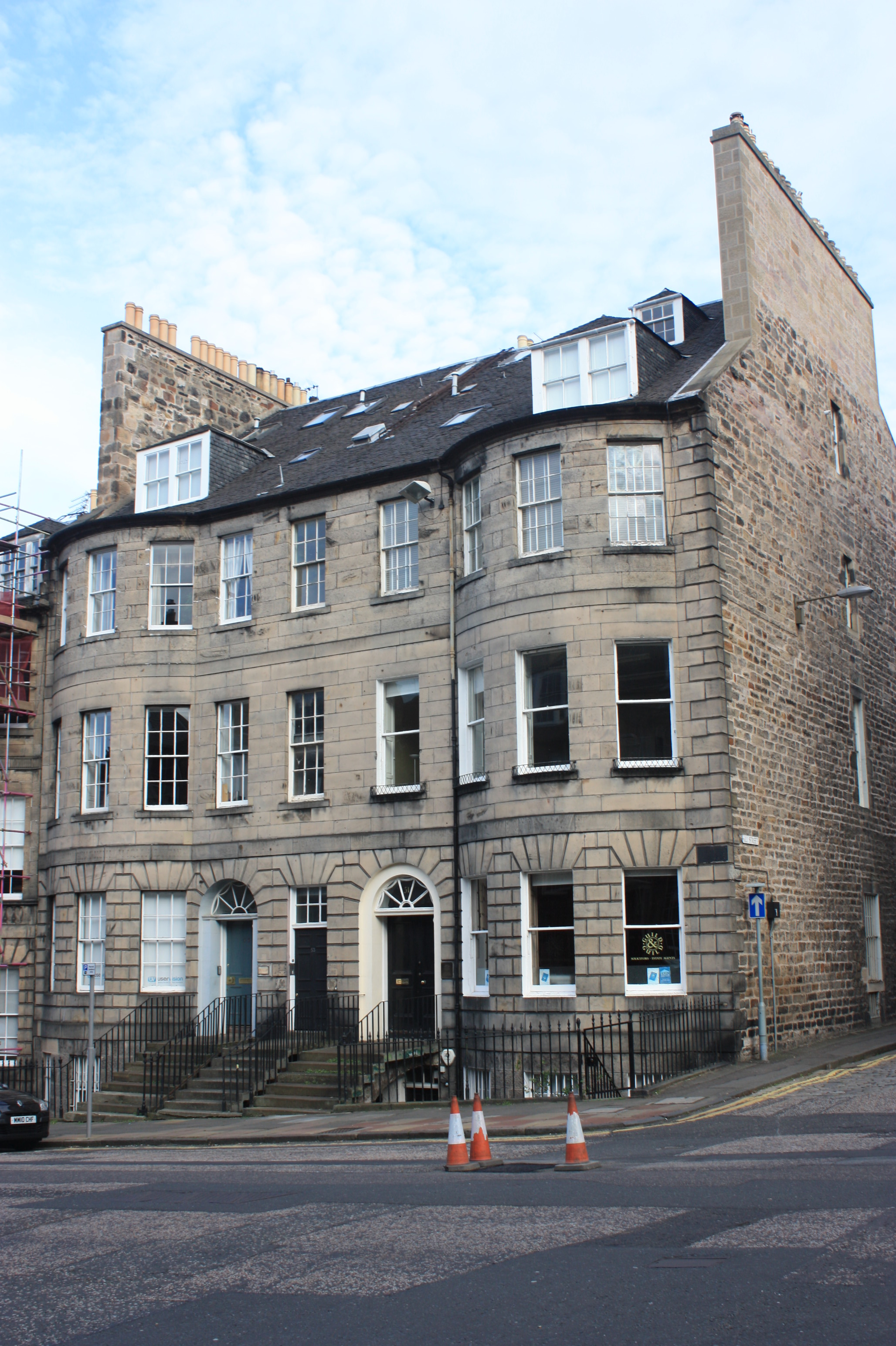
The Innes office at 51 North Castle Street, Edinburgh (right door)

Cosmo Nelson Innes FRSE (9 September 1798 – 31 July 1874) was a Scottish advocate, judge, historian and antiquary. He served as Advocate-Depute, Sheriff of Elginshire, and Principal Clerk of Session.

He was a skilled decipherer of ancient Scottish records and helped to compile, edit and index Acts of the Scottish Parliament 1124–1707. He was said to be tall, handsome but shy. He was accused of being a Catholic sympathiser whilst it remained illegal, and joined the Scottish Episcopal Church, closer in some practices to the Catholic Church. Dean Ramsay, head of the Episcopal Church, was one of his friends.

== Life ==
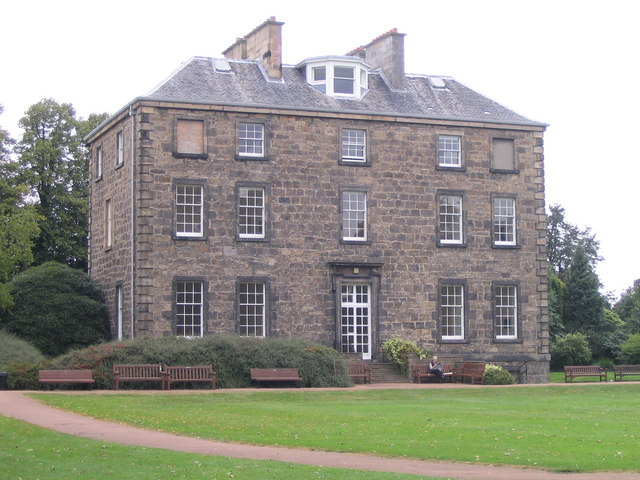
The home of Cosmo Innes in later life: Inverleith House

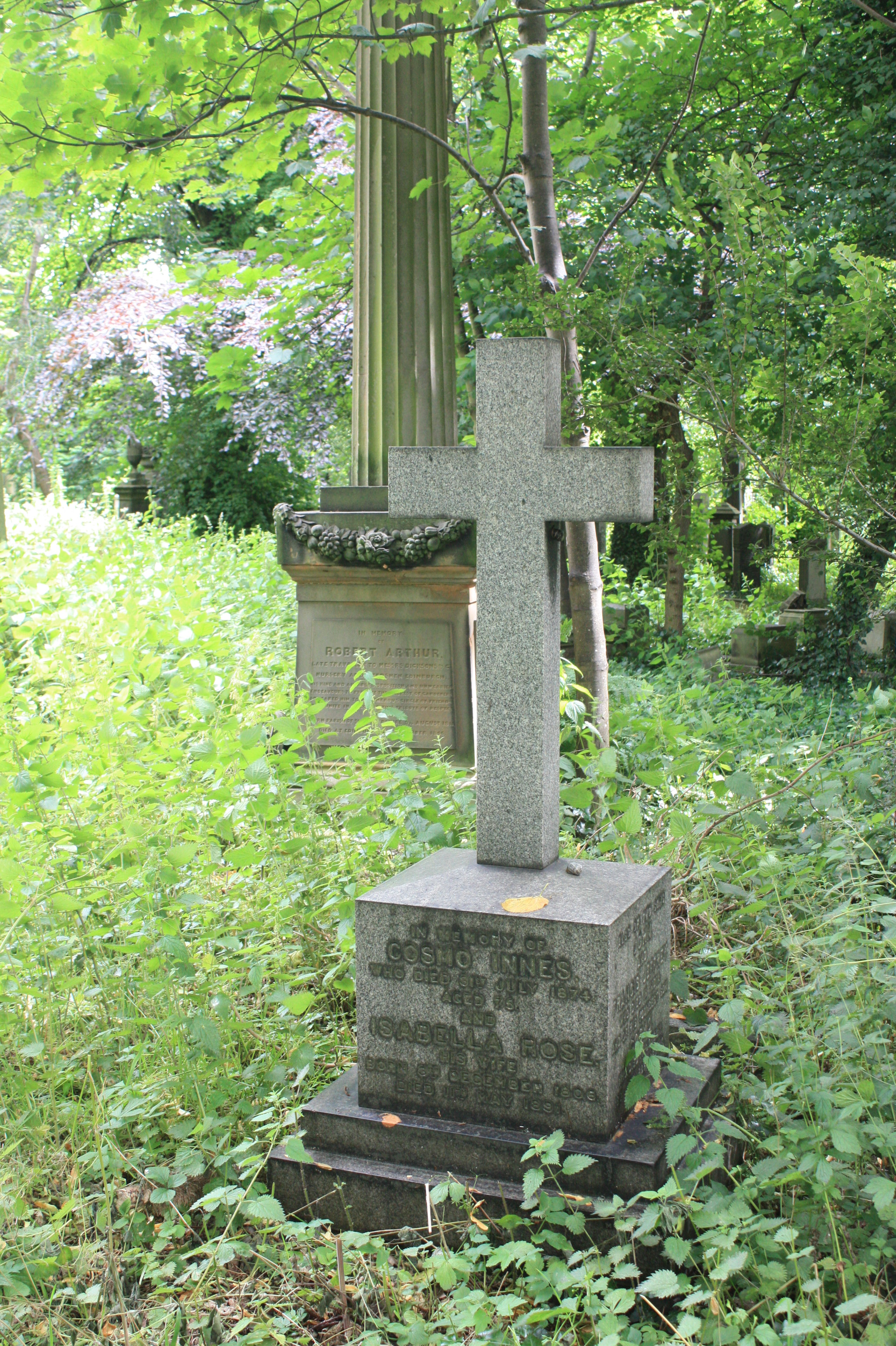
The grave of Cosmo Innes, Warriston Cemetery, Edinburgh

Born in Durris House to Euphemia Russell and John Innes of Leuchars WS. His middle name, Nelson, is almost certainly to mark Horatio Nelson's then recent victory at the Battle of the Nile in August 1798. Thirteen of his 14 siblings died, only he and his sister Elizabeth survived. His friends included Alexander Forbes Irvine (1818–1892), whose career closely paralleled his own.

He was educated at Edinburgh High School, then at the University of Edinburgh under Professor James Pillans. He then undertook further studies at the universities of Aberdeen and Glasgow, and at Balliol College, Oxford (1817–1820) graduating with a BA 1820. He was admitted to the Faculty of Advocates in 1822, and was appointed Professor of Constitutional Law and History at the University of Edinburgh in 1846.

In the 1830s he lived in Allan Ramsay's former house, Ramsay Lodge, at the top of the Royal Mile (later absorbed into Ramsay Gardens). He had offices with his brother, Thomas Innes, at 51 North Castle Street in the New Town.

From 1840 to 1852 he was Sheriff of Elgin during which time he had to deal with protesters angry at the continued export of grain from their district after the potato crop on which they relied heavily was lost to blight. On Wednesday 27 January 1847, Innes and his special constables were repulsed by a mob after they attempted to arrest the leaders of the protesters who had unloaded oatmeal from the cargo vessel James and Bessie in Burghead harbour and returned it to the grain-merchant's granary. The Sheriff and his party were obliged to retreat to Elgin and call for military assistance. Innes resigned from his post as Sheriff in 1852 to succeed Thomas Thomson in the role of Principal Clerk of Session in the Scottish Court of Session.

In 1843 he became a member of the Edinburgh Calotype Club one of the world's first photographic societies. He was also a member of the Spalding Club, Maitland Club and Bannatyne Club.

In 1858 he was elected a Fellow of the Royal Society of Scotland. His proposer was James Thomson Gibson-Craig. He served as the Society's Vice-President 1862–69.

In later life Innes lived in Inverleith House in northern Edinburgh. The house still exists and is in the grounds of Edinburgh's Royal Botanic Garden. The Garden was formed from Innes' former garden grounds.

He died unexpectedly on 31 July 1874 at Killin while on a "Highland Tour". He was buried on 5 August at Warriston Cemetery in Edinburgh. The grave lies on the east side of the main west path, just beyond the large Celtic cross to Horatio McCulloch. Given that Innes was one of the richest persons in Edinburgh, the gravestone is exceptionally modest.

== Works ==
He was the author of Memoir of Thomas Thomson, Advocate (1854), Scotland in the Middle Ages (1860), Sketches of Early Scottish History (1861), Lectures on Scotch Legal Antiquities (1872) and Reminiscences of Scottish Life and Character (1875, co-written with Dean Ramsay)). He also edited many historical manuscripts for the Bannatyne Club and other antiquarian clubs. He also frequently wrote for the Quarterly Review and North British Review.

Photographic works include "A Tour: The Coast of Spain" (an album of 1857); Midcalder Church (1856); Dunrobin Castle (1856); and Elgin Cathedral (1856).

== Family ==
In 1826 Innes married Isabella Rose, daughter of Hugh Rose of Kilravock. They had nine children: four daughters and five sons.

- Katherine Innes (1824-1898) married historian John Hill Burton in 1855. Her children included engineer W. K. Burton, the artist Mary Rose Hill Burton and the chemist Professor Cosmo Innes Burton FCS FRSE.
- Euphemia Innes died of scarlet fever.
- John Innes (1829-1853) died in India whilst serving in the army.
- Hugh Rose Innes (1832-1868) served in China. He died of rheumatism in his parents' arms.
- Francis Jeffrey Innes, Lieutenant of the Bombay Staff Corps and Adjutant of the 4th Cavalry, Hyderabad, died in India in 1867.
- James Innes (1834-), colonial administrator. He married the author Emily Innes.
- Cosmo Innes (1842-1887) engineer who was involved in the construction of the railways in India.
- Margaret Isabella Innes (1843-1929) married Captain Forbes Mackay.
- Mary Innes (1846-1911) married Robert Finlay, 1st Viscount Finlay, Lord Chancellor of Great Britain.

From 1836 he and his wife were appointed the formal guardian of their niece, Isabella Grant, whose parents had died in India. In 1844, her uncle Captain Alexander Grant, brother of her father Patrick, challenged the guardianship, however the court found the challenge inappropriate as her home was wholly appropriate and was the will of her father.
