= Mary Burton =

Scottish educational and social reformer

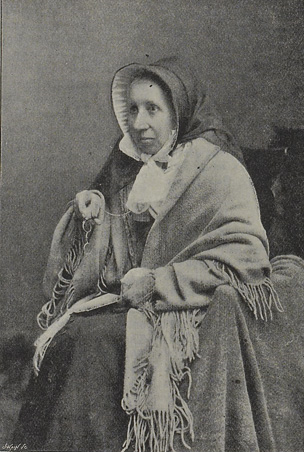
- Born: Mary Hill Burton; August 7, 1819; Aberdeen, Scotland, United Kingdom
- Died: March 19, 1909 (aged 89); Aberdeen, Scotland, United Kingdom
- Relatives: John Hill Burton (brother)

Mary Hill Burton (7 February 1819 – 19 March 1909) was a Scottish social and educational reformer and the first woman governor of Heriot-Watt College.

== Biography ==
Burton was born in Aberdeen on 7 February 1819, the daughter of William Kinninmont Burton (d. 1819), a lieutenant in the British Army, and Elizabeth (d. 1848), daughter of John Paton of Grandholm, Aberdeenshire, She moved to Edinburgh in 1832 with her widowed mother and her brother, the lawyer and historian John Hill Burton.

A single woman, with an independent income from rental properties, she was a supporter of the Edinburgh National Society for Women's Suffrage and an advocate for improving access to education for women and working people. In 1868, she went to court, unsuccessfully, for the right to register to vote.

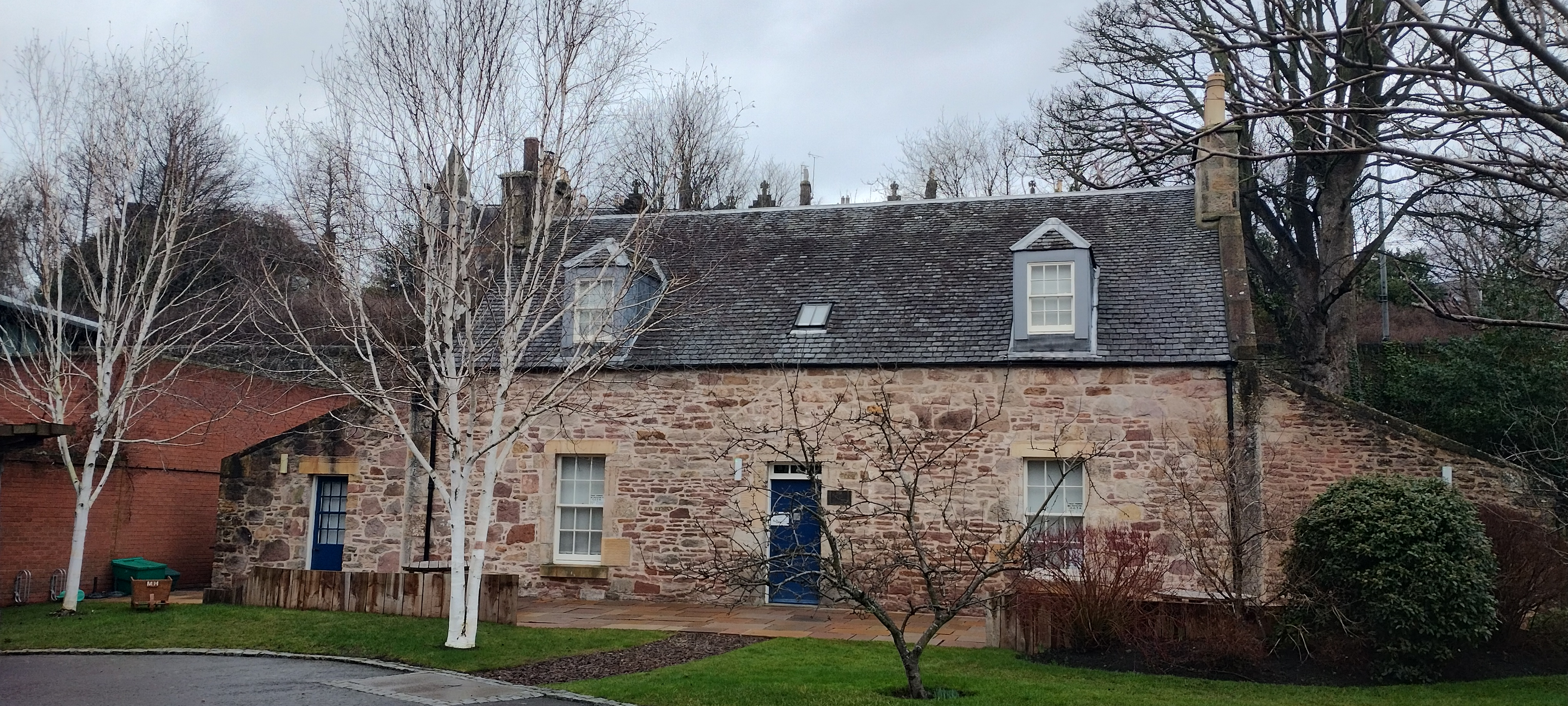
Liberton Bank House, where Burton began living in 1844.

Mary Burton successfully campaigned for the Watt Institution to admit women students on equal terms to men in 1869, twenty-three years before legislation required Scottish universities to do so. Her niece Ella Burton was one of the early women students to benefit.

Mary Burton was one of the first women elected to serve on Parochial and School Boards and became the first woman on the School's Board of Directors and later the first woman governor of Heriot-Watt College and Honorary President of the Watt Literary Association.

She purchased Liberton Bank House on Gilmerton Road, Edinburgh, in 1844 and lived there until 1898. Arthur Conan Doyle, a family friend, lodged there while a student at Newington Academy in the 1860s.

She died in 1909 in Aberdeen and is buried in Dean Cemetery, Edinburgh. In her will she left £100 (equivalent to £10,300 in 2025) "to provide prizes for 'deserving students irrespective of age or sex' attending evening classes at Heriot-Watt College and £100 to the Edinburgh Women's Suffrage Society to campaign 'for the admission of women to sit as members of parliament, either at Westminster or in a Scottish Parliament'".

== Legacy ==
Heriot-Watt University has honoured Mary Burton with a fund for female students studying STEM subjects launched in 2019 on the 200th anniversary of her birth. The Mary Burton building on the university's main Riccarton campus is named after her. There is a blue plaque in her honour.

In 2022 Historic Environment Scotland placed a plaque to commemorate Burton at Liberton Bank House in Edinburgh.
