= Lark (person) =

Person who usually gets up early in the morning and goes to bed early in the evening

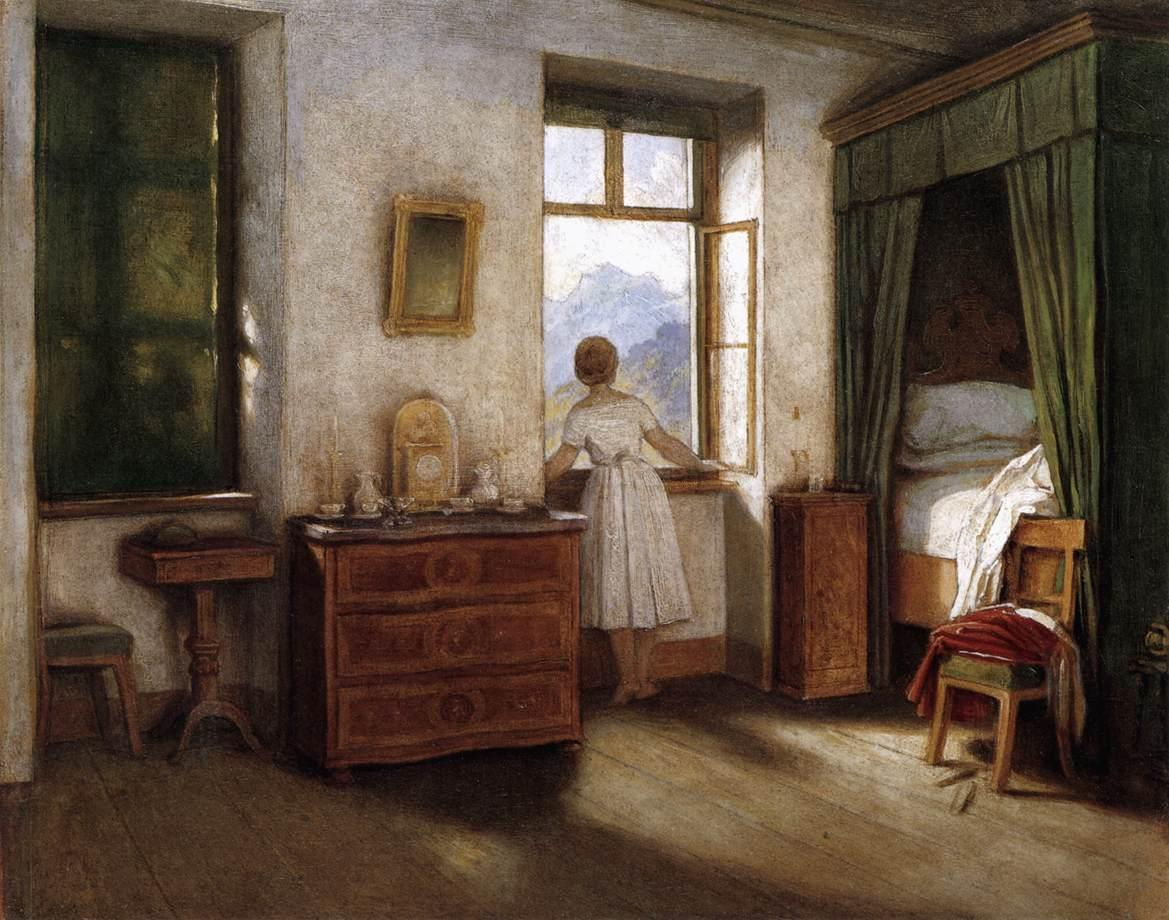
Early Morning (c. 1858) by Moritz von Schwind

A lark, early bird, morning person, or (in Scandinavian countries) an A-person, is a person who usually gets up early in the morning and goes to bed early in the evening. The term relates to the birds known as larks, which are known to sing before dawn. Human "larks" tend to feel most energetic just after they get up in the morning. They are thus well-suited for working the day shift.

The opposite of the lark is the owl, often awake at night. A person called a night owl is someone who usually stays up late and may feel most awake in the evening and at night. Researchers have traditionally used the terms morningness and eveningness to describe these two chronotypes.

== Charting chronotypes ==
Till Roenneberg, a chronobiologist in Munich, has mapped the circadian rhythms of more than 200,000 people. Biological processes, including sleep-wake patterns, that display an oscillation of about 24 hours are called circadian rhythms. According to Roenneberg, the distribution of circadian rhythms spans from the very early to the very late chronotypes, similarly to how height varies from short to tall.

As circadian rhythm is independent of the number of hours of sleep a person needs, Roenneberg calculates the rhythm based on the midpoint of the sleep period. A person who goes to bed at midnight and rises at 8 thus has the same chronotype as a person who goes to bed at 1 a.m. and rises at 7; the midpoint of sleep is 4 a.m. for both of these individuals.

People with early chronotypes will usually not be able to "sleep in", even if they have stayed up later than usual. While fit for a "lark-like" societal framework, they find it hard to adapt to a context where "sleeping in" is common: despite feeling refreshed in the morning, they may feel hampered socially when confronted with some kinds of social gatherings (such as soirées) that are often scheduled for the evening, even if most kinds of social events are not.

People with late chronotypes go to bed late and rise late. Forced to arise earlier than their circadian rhythm dictates, they have a low body temperature and may require a few hours to feel really awake. They are unable to fall asleep as early as "larks" can.

== Prevalence ==
A 2007 survey of over 55,000 people found that chronotypes tend to follow a normal distribution, with extreme morning and evening types on the far ends. There are studies that suggest genes determine whether a person is a lark or an evening person in the same way it is implicated in people's attitude toward authority, unconventional behavior, as well as reading and television viewing habits. For instance, there is the case of the Per2 gene on chromosome 2, which was discovered in the early 1990s by Urs Albrecht and colleagues at the University of Fribourg in Switzerland. This gene regulates the circadian clock and a variant of it was found in families that demonstrated advanced sleep-phase syndrome. According to the researchers, its existence in people skews sleep pattern even if the period also cover eight hours.

Age is also implicated in the way one becomes a morning or a night person. It is explained that, developmentally, people are generally night owls in their teens while they become larks later in life. Infants also tend to be early risers.

== Career options ==
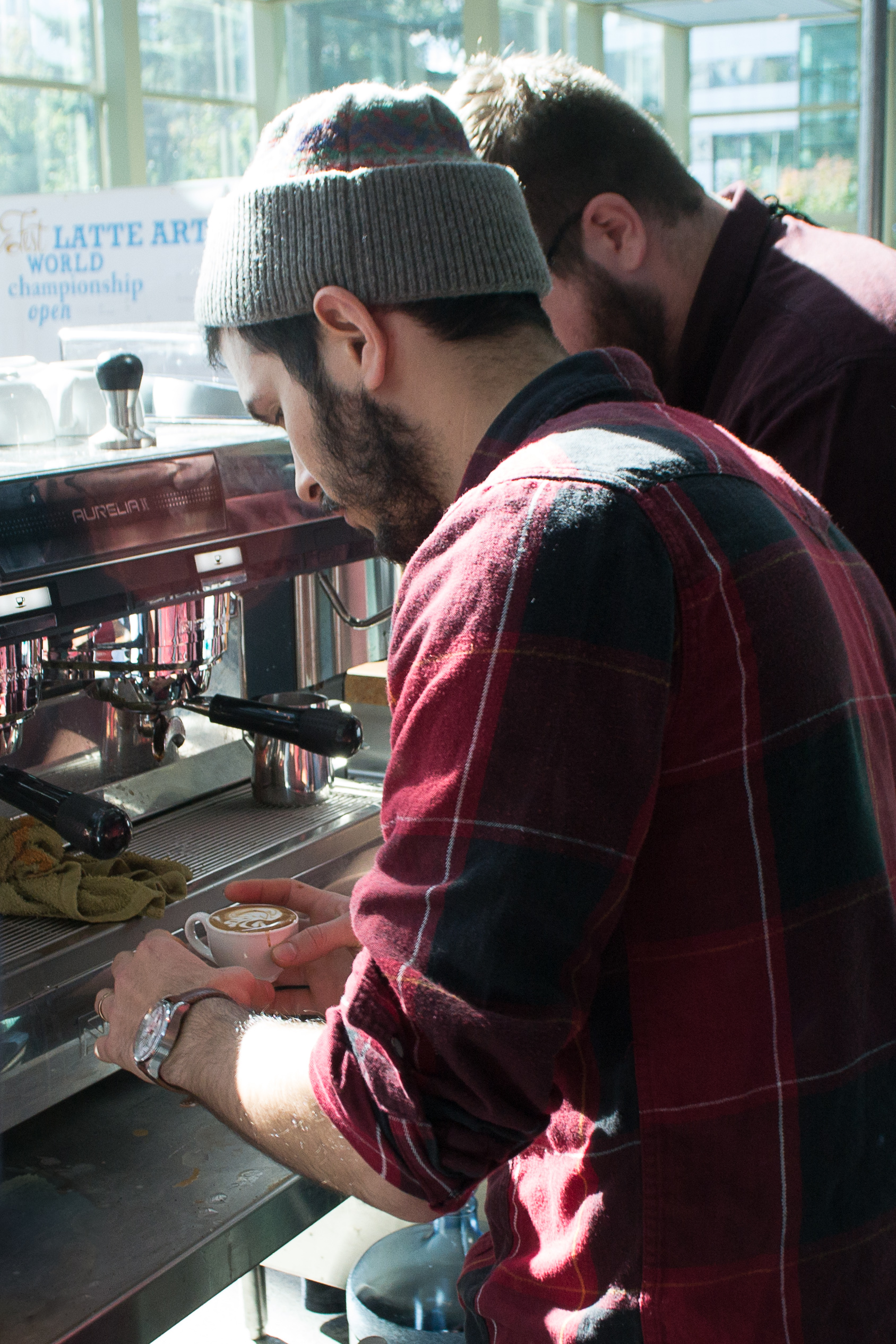
Morning larks may be employed as baristas in coffee shops.

Morning larks tend to thrive in careers that start early in the morning. Industries that tend to be favorable to morning larks include farming, construction, and working for public utilities. Many employees in these industries start working at or before 7:00 a.m. Some professions are well known for their early morning hours, including bakers, school teachers, dairy farmers, and surgeons.

Morning larks tend to be less represented among the employees of restaurants, hotels, entertainment venues, and retail stores, which tend to be open until later in the evening. However, morning larks may be perfectly suited to the opening shift of a coffee shop, handling the morning rush at a hotel, or working on the morning news shows for radio or television. Morning larks may also work the early shift in round-the-clock industries, such as emergency services, transportation, healthcare, and manufacturing.

Many large businesses that operate in the evening or at night need employees at all levels, from entry-level employees to managers to skilled staff, whenever they are open. For example, most hospitals employ many types of workers around the clock:

- non-medical staff such as security guards, IT specialists, cleaning and maintenance workers, cooks and food service staff, and admissions clerks;
- medical staff such as nurses, paramedics, radiology technicians, pharmacists, and phlebotomists;
- managers for each of the main hospital wards or activities, including janitorial supervisors and head nurses.

== See also ==
- Advanced sleep phase syndrome
- Circadian rhythm sleep disorder
- Diurnality
- FASPS
- Morningness–eveningness questionnaire (MEQ)
- Munich ChronoType Questionnaire (MCTQ)
- Night owl
- Nocturnality
- Waking up early
