= Afternoon =

Time of the day between noon and evening

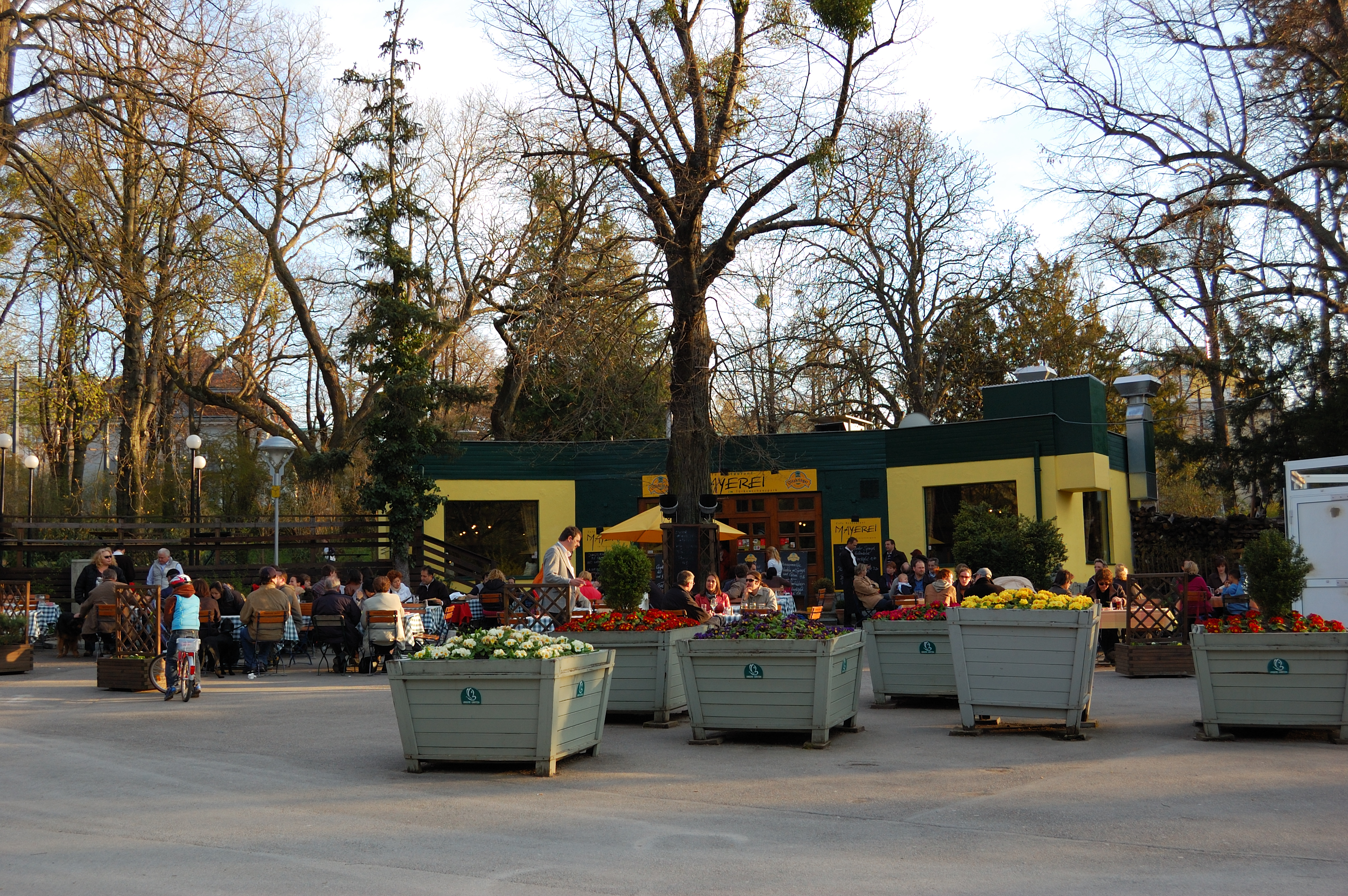
The Türkenschanzpark in Vienna during the early afternoon

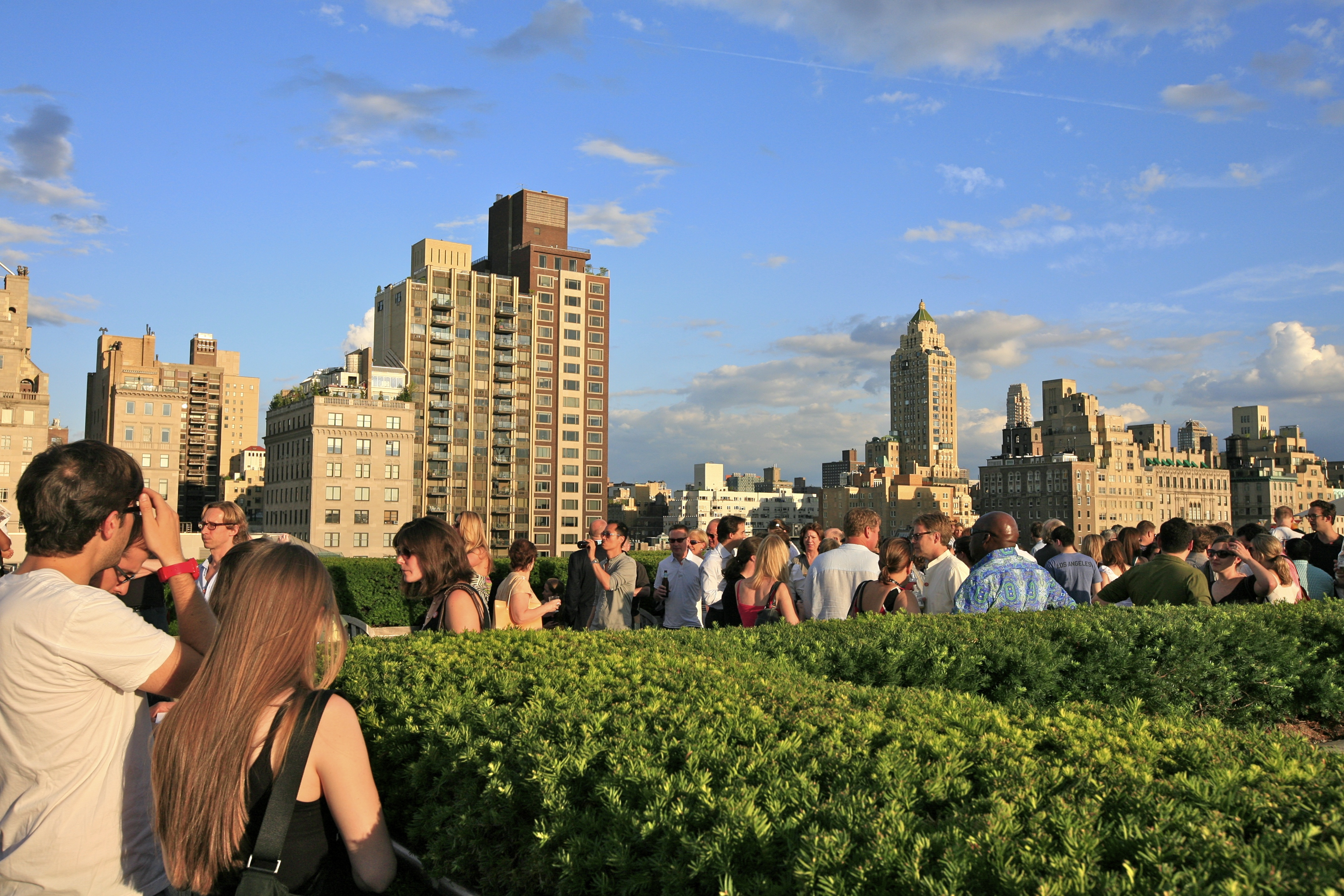
Visitors to the Metropolitan Museum of Art in New York City during the late afternoon

Afternoon is the period from noon to sunset or evening. It is the time when the sun is descending from its peak in the sky to somewhat before its terminus at the horizon in the west. In human life, it occupies roughly the latter half of the standard work and school day. In literal terms, it refers to a time specifically after noon.

== Terminology ==
Afternoon is often defined as the period between noon and sunset. If this definition is adopted, the specific range of time varies in one direction: noon is defined as the time when the sun reaches its highest point in the sky, but the boundary between afternoon and evening has no standard definition. However, before a period of transition from the 12th to 14th centuries, noon instead referred to 3:00 pm. Possible explanations include shifting times for prayers and midday meals, along which one concept of noon was defined—and so afternoon would have referred to a narrower timeframe.

The word afternoon, which derives from after and noon, has been attested from about the year 176BC; Middle English contained both afternoon and the synonym aftermete. The standard phrasing was at afternoon in the 15th and 16th centuries, but has shifted to in the afternoon since then. In American English dialects, the word evening is sometimes used to encompass all times between noon and midnight. Irish Gaelic contains four different words to mark time intervals from late afternoon to nightfall; this period is considered mystical. Metaphorically, the word afternoon refers to a relatively late period in the expanse of time or in one's life.

The equivalent of Earth's afternoon on another planet would be the time that the principal star of that planetary system would be in descent from its prime meridian, as seen from the planet's surface.

== Events ==
Afternoon is a time when the sun is descending from its daytime peak. During the afternoon, the sun moves from roughly the center of the sky to deep in the west. In late afternoon, daylight is particularly bright and glaring, because the sun is at a low angle in the sky. The standard working time in most industrialized countries goes from the morning to the late afternoon or early evening – archetypally, 9:00 am to 5:00 pm – so the latter part of this time takes place in the afternoon. Schools usually let their students out around 3:00 pm during the mid afternoon. In Denmark, afternoon is considered between 1:00 and 5:00 pm.

== Effects on life ==
=== Hormones ===
In diurnal animals, it is typical for blood levels of the hormone cortisol—which is used to increase blood sugar, aid metabolism and is also produced in response to stress—to be most stable in the afternoon after decreasing throughout the morning. However, cortisol levels are also the most reactive to environmental changes unrelated to sleep and daylight during the afternoon. As a result, this time of day is considered optimal for researchers studying stress and hormone levels. Plants generally have their highest photosynthetic levels of the day at noon and in the early afternoon, owing to the sun's high angle in the sky. The large proliferation of maize crops across Earth has caused tiny, harmless fluctuations in the normal pattern of atmospheric carbon dioxide levels, since these crops photosynthesize large amounts of carbon dioxide during these times and this process sharply drops down during the late afternoon and evening.

=== Body temperature ===
In humans, body temperature is typically highest during the mid to late afternoon. However, human athletes being tested for physical vigor on exercise machines showed no statistically significant difference after lunch. Owners of factory farms are advised to use buildings with an east–west (as opposed to north–south) orientation to house their livestock, because an east–west orientation generally means thicker walls on the east and west to accommodate the sun's acute angle and intense glare during late afternoon. When these animals are too hot, they are more likely to become belligerent and unproductive.

=== Alertness ===
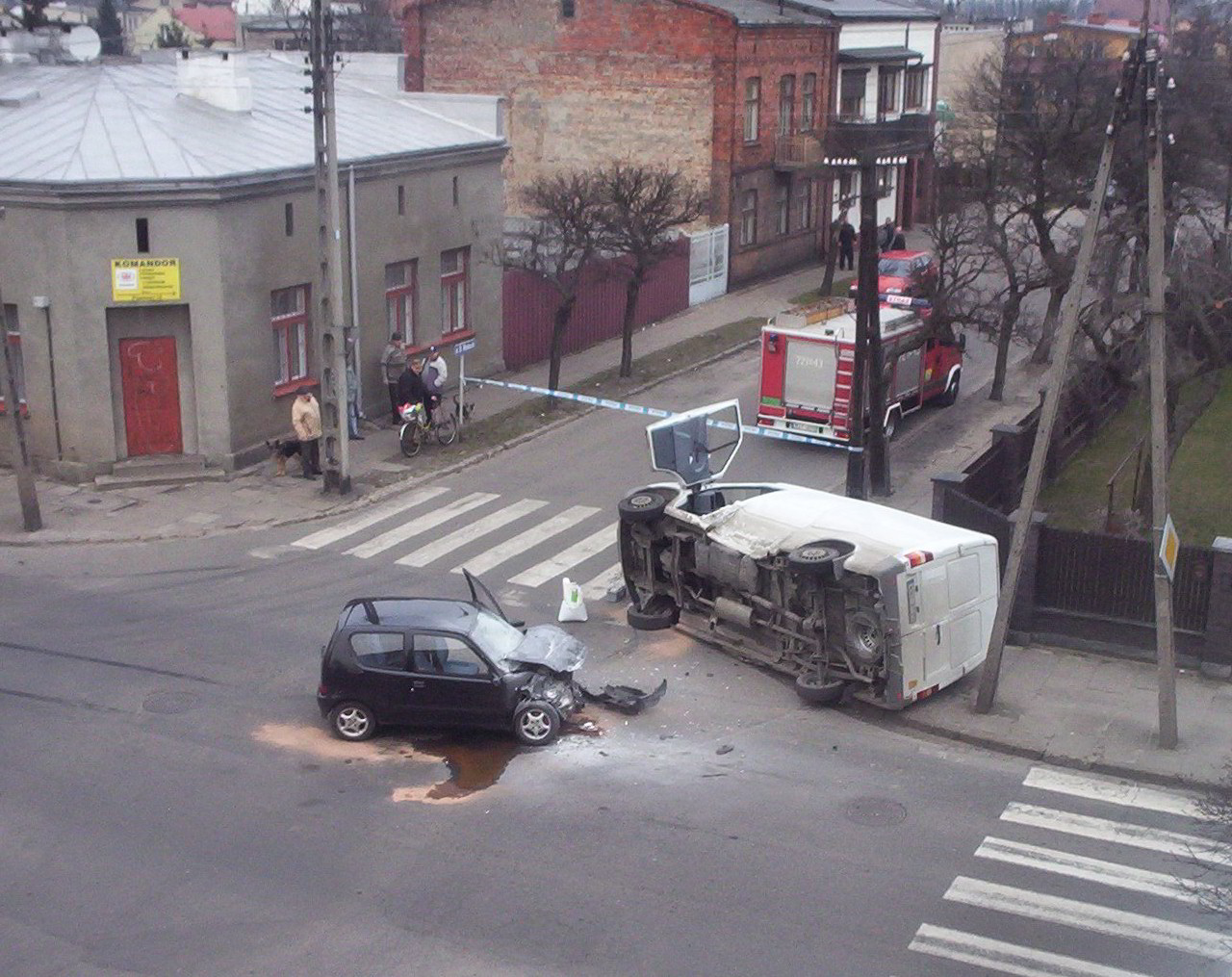
Motor vehicle accidents like this one in Poland are common during the afternoon, especially rush hour.

The afternoon, especially the early afternoon, is associated with a dip in a variety of areas of human cognitive and productive functioning. Notably, motor vehicle accidents occur more frequently in the early afternoon, when drivers presumably have recently finished lunch. A study of motor accidents in Sweden between 1987 and 1991 found that the time around 5:00 pm had by far the most accidents: around 1,600 at 5:00 pm, compared to around 1,000 each at 4:00 pm and 6:00 pm. This trend may have been influenced by the afternoon rush hour, but the morning rush hour showed a much smaller increase. In Finland, accidents in the agriculture industry are most common in the afternoon, specifically Monday afternoons in September.

One psychology professor studying circadian rhythms found that his students performed somewhat worse on exams in the afternoon than in the morning, but even worse in the evening. Neither of these differences, however, was statistically significant. Four studies carried out in 1997 found that subjects who were given tests on differentiating traffic signs had longer reaction times when tested at 3:00 pm and 6:00 pm than at 9:00 am and 12:00 pm. These trends are held across all four studies and for both complex and abstract questions. However, one UK-based researcher failed to find any difference in exam performance on over 300,000 A-level exam papers sat in either the morning or afternoon.

Human productivity routinely decreases in the afternoon. Power plants have shown significant reductions in productivity in the afternoon compared to the morning, the largest differences occurring on Saturdays and the smallest on Mondays. One 1950s study covering two female factory workers for six months found that their productivity was 13 percent lower in the afternoon, the least productive time being their last hour at work. It was summarized that the differences came from personal breaks and unproductive activities at the workplace. Another, larger study found that afternoon declines in productivity were greater during longer work shifts.

Not all humans share identical circadian rhythms. One study across Italy and Spain had students fill out a questionnaire, then ranked them on a "morningness–eveningness" scale. The results were a fairly standard bell curve. Levels of alertness over the course of the day had a significant correlation with scores on the questionnaire. All categories of participants—evening types, morning types, and intermediate types—had high levels of alertness from roughly 2:00 pm to 8:00 pm, but outside this window their alertness levels corresponded to their scores.

== See also ==
- Twilight
- 12-hour clock
- Night owl
