= Roenneberg =

Roenneberg may refer to:

- Roenneberg hundred at the List of hundreds of Sweden
- Till Roenneberg - German circadian rhythm scientist
