= Martha Merrow =

American chronobiologist (born 1957)

- Born: 1957 (age 68–69); Bloomfield, Connecticut
- Known for: MCTQ, Chronotype, Aschoff's Rule (prize)
- Scientific career
- Fields: Chronobiology
- Institutions: University of Groningen, LMU Munich

Martha Merrow (born 1957) is an American chronobiologist. She currently chairs the Institute of Medical Psychology at LMU Munich. Her career focuses primarily on investigating the molecular and genetic mechanisms of the circadian clock. Since joining LMU Munich in 1996, Merrow has investigated molecular and genetic mechanisms of the circadian clock as well as daily human behavior and medical psychology.

== Life ==
Merrow was born in 1957 in Bloomfield, Connecticut and currently resides in Munich, Germany with her two daughters.

=== Education ===
Merrow received her bachelor's degree in biology at Middlebury College in 1979. After working in a pediatric nephrology laboratory under Dr. Thomas Kennedy for five years, Merrow headed to Tufts University School of Medicine and earned her Ph.D. in Immunology in 1991. Later that year, she pursued her Post-Doctoral Fellowship in Chronobiology at Dartmouth Medical School, which she completed in 1996.

== Career ==
=== Research ===
Merrow is well known for her work on the entrainment of circadian clocks in both humans and the fungus Neurospora crassa. She has also worked to describe circadian clocks in mutant or model genetic organisms lacking clear circadian phenotypes. Merrow worked with colleagues Till Roenneberg and Anna Wirz-Justice to develop the Munich ChronoType Questionnaire ((MCTQ)), which assesses human chronotypes. Those with early chronotypes may be referred to as “larks” while those with late chronotypes may be referred to as “owls.”

Merrow's molecular chronobiology lab at LMU Munich uses nematodes, yeast, fungi, and human tissue cultures to study the circadian clock in simple systems. Her research focuses on oscillations at the cellular and molecular levels as a representation of organismal rhythms. Merrow's lab often uses techniques such as the insertion of Luciferase gene fusions or Green Fluroescent Protein to visualize oscillations of RNA levels, protein abundance, or protein modifications within the cell. Oscillations in the entrained phase can then be compared to the organism's free running period or the phase produced by other methods of entrainment to elucidate the mechanism of the clock.

=== Professional achievements ===
While she was a professor of Chronobiology at University of Groningen, Merrow led Sub-Project 4: Novel Clock Genes and Principles within EUCLOCK, a European organization of researchers interested in entrainment of circadian clocks. Merrow has served as the secretary and a member for the SRBR and is currently the vice-president of the European Biological Rhythms Society (EBRS). Merrow coordinated the OnTime consortium, a group consisting of Netherlands-based researchers in the field of chronobiology and is a member of the Program Committee for the upcoming XV EBRS Congress event to be held in Amsterdam. The group attempts to improve health through an understanding of circadian clocks and their entrainment. This consortium has its roots in Merrow's organization of the Dutch Clock Club, which is based on the structure of the UK Clock Club. She remains active in academia and has taught at the European Summer School for Chronobiology nearly every year since and including 1996. Additionally, Merrow strives to develop networks for women in science.

==== Timeline of achievements ====
- 2004: Received Aschoff's Rule prize from EBRS (European Biological Rhythms Society)
- 2004: Rosalind Franklin Research Fellowship at University of Groningen
- 2006: Became Full Professor of Molecular and Genetic Chronobiology at University of Groningen
- 2006: VICI Award
- 2011: Awarded OnTime Grant
- 2012: Became Chair of Institute for Medical Psychology at LMU Munich
- 2014: Produced a Coursera on Chronobiology

== Selected publications ==
Some of Merrow's publications include:

- Till Roenneberg & Martha Merrow (2016). "The Circadian Clock and Human Health". Current Biology. 26 (10): R432–R443. Bibcode:2016CBio...26.R432R. doi:10.1016/j.cub.2016.04.011. PMID 27218855.
- Vincent van der Vinne, Giulia Zerbini, Anne Siersema, Amy Pieper, Martha Merrow, Roelof A. Hut, Till Roenneberg & Thomas Kantermann (2015). "Timing of examinations affects school performance differently in early and late chronotypes" (PDF). Journal of Biological Rhythms. 30 (1): 53–60. doi:10.1177/0748730414564786. PMID 25537752. S2CID 10941333.
- M. Merrow, M. Brunner & T. Roenneberg (1999). "Assignment of circadian function for the Neurospora clock gene frequency" (PDF). Nature. 399 (6736): 584–586. Bibcode:1999Natur.399..584M. doi:10.1038/21190. hdl:11370/f3afd147-0431-46a1-9471-3df73e14d070. PMID 10376598. S2CID 4422762.
- Till Roenneberg, Anna Wirz-Justice & Martha Merrow (2003). "Life between clocks: daily temporal patterns of human chronotypes". Journal of Biological Rhythms. 18 (1): 80–90. doi:10.1177/0748730402239679. hdl:11370/d4fcf07b-97b2-4d4a-b1fe-07596c20f5bf. PMID 12568247. S2CID 15655036.
- Maria Olmedo, John S. O'Neill, Rachel S. Edgar, Utham K. Valekunja, Akhilesh B. Reddy & Martha Merrow (2012). "Circadian regulation of olfaction and an evolutionarily conserved, nontranscriptional marker in Caenorhabditis elegans". Proceedings of the National Academy of Sciences of the United States of America. 109 (50): 20479–20484. Bibcode:2012PNAS..10920479O. doi:10.1073/pnas.1211705109. PMC 3528576. PMID 23185015.
