= Choghadiya =

Auspicious period in Indian astrology

Choghadiya (Chogaḍīā) refers to an auspicious period of ninety-eight minutes in Indian astrology.

== Etymology ==
Ghadi (now used for a clock in Hindi) is an ancient measure for calculations of time in India roughly equivalent to 24 minutes. Cho-ghadiya means four ghadi which totals to 96 minutes. Most of choghadiya are of a figure around 96 minutes.

== About ==
it is advisable to perform necessary prayers, on a particular time phase of the day to get maximum benefits of health, wealth and prosperity. One can get the appropriate Muhurta (Hindu Unit of Time) from the Panchang.

== Types of Choghadiya ==
There are totally seven types of Choghdiya.

- Amrit, Shubh and Labh are considered the most auspicious Choghadiyas. (Time Period)
- Chal is considered as good Choghadiya . (Time Period)
- Udveg, Kal and Rog is considered inauspicious.

== Method of calculation ==
Each day is divided into two time periods: Daytime - the period from sunrise to sunset Nighttime - the period from sunset to sunrise.

Each period contains eight Choghadiya's. The daytime difference is arrived at by calculating the difference between Sunrise and Sunset and dividing the same by 8.

=== Example ===
Day 1: Sunrise at 6:00 AM and Sunset at 6:01 pm Day 2: Sunrise at 6:00 am

based on the above The daytime period is 12 hours and 01 minutes (721 minutes). The nighttime period is 11 hours and 59 minutes (719 minutes).

Therefore, each daytime Choghadiya lasts 721/8 = 90.125 minutes = 1 hour 30 minutes 7.5 seconds And each night-time Choghadiya last 719/8 = 89.89 minutes = 1 hour 29 minutes 52.5 second
