= Brahmamuhurta =

Period before sunrise that is believed to be auspicious for yoga, meditation and worship

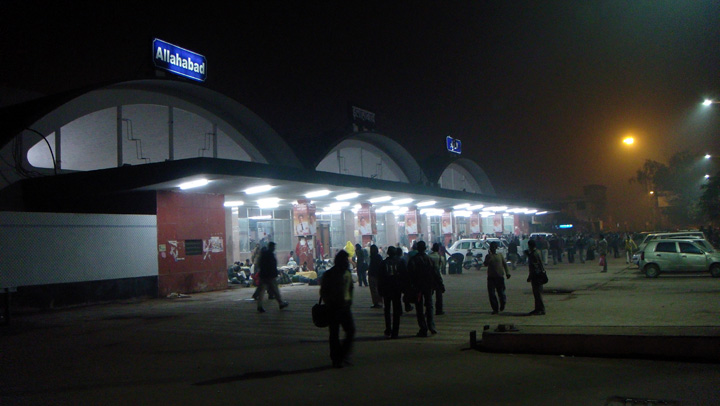
Prayagraj Junction railway station at 5:52 am in December, one and one quarter hours before sunrise

Brahmamuhurta (Sanskrit: ब्रह्ममुहूर्त, lit. 'time of Brahma') is a 48-minute period (muhurta) that begins one hour and 36 minutes before sunrise, and ends 48 minutes before sunrise. It is traditionally the penultimate phase or muhurta of the night, and is considered an auspicious time for all practices of yoga and most appropriate for meditation, worship or any other religious practice. Spiritual activities performed early in the morning are said to have a greater effect than in any other part of the day.

Brahmamuhurta is the 14th muhurta kala of the night. One muhurta is a period of 48 minutes, with a whole night consisting of 15 muhurtas. The time of sunrise varies each day, according to geographic location and time of year, and the time of the brahmamuhurta varies with it. For example, if sunrise is at 6:00 am, the brahmamuhurta begins at 4:24 am and ends at 5:12 am.

== In Ayurveda/Yoga ==
Ayurveda medicine states that there are three doshas found in the human physical body, called Vata (air and ether), Pitta (fire and water) and Kapha (earth and water). The increase or decrease of these three doshas is related to the cycles of time. From sunrise until 10:00 am is the time of Kapha; from 10:00 am until 2:00 pm is the time of Pitta; and from 2:00 pm until 6:00 pm (sunset) is the time of Vata.

The evening follows a similar pattern, with the period from 2:00 am until 6:00 am (sunrise) being Vata time. Brahmamuhurta occurs during this phase, and yoga masters state that the best time to meditate is one and a half hours before dawn, because the atmosphere is pure and quiet, the activities of the stomach and intestines have stopped, the mind has no deep impressions on the conscious level and is empty of thoughts in preparation for the day ahead, enabling one to achieve a deeper meditative state. This is also in line with recent finding, which seem to suggest that things simply 'feel better in the morning'.

Yoga teacher Tirumalai Krishnamacharya stated "Think of God. If not God, the sun, if not the sun, your parents." Krishnamacharya identified himself with Vaishnavism, or the worship of Vishnu, as did Ananta, under the guidance of Shiva, who is the first yogi. A modern yogi would then show reverence to the sun.

In the Kali Yuga, divinity can still be reached through yoga, but because of the agitated mind associated with the Yuga, Yoga must be practiced through Kriya, based on asana. It is therefore common for modern yogis whose lineage can be traced to Krishnamacharya to practice the Suryanamaskara, or sun salutation, in the morning. The Suryanamaskara can be used in ritual cleansing practice that uses the mind states associated with 'Vata' in Ayurveda medicine. These mind states are mentioned in Patanjali's Yoga Sutras These qualities are nearer to the divine, as they pertain to stillness of the mind, which allows for the spirit to shine. It is because of the inherently stiller state of mind in the brahmamuhurta, that meditative states can be more easily achieved.

== See also ==
- Amrit Velā
- Blue hour
- Waking up early
