= Morningness–eveningness questionnaire =

Self-assessment on circadian rhythm

The morningness–eveningness questionnaire (MEQ) is a self-assessment questionnaire developed by researchers James A. Horne and Olov Östberg in 1976. Its main purpose is to measure whether a person's circadian rhythm (biological clock) produces peak alertness in the morning, in the evening, or in between. The original study showed that the subjective time of peak alertness correlates with the time of peak body temperature; morning types (early birds) have an earlier temperature peak than evening types (night owls), with intermediate types having temperature peaks between the morning and evening chronotype groups. The MEQ is widely used in psychological and medical research and has been professionally cited more than 4,000 times.

== MEQ questions ==
The standard MEQ consists of 19 multiple-choice questions, each having four or five response options. Some example questions are:

1. What time would you get up if you were entirely free to plan your day?
12. If you got into bed at 11:00 PM, how tired would you be?
17. Suppose you can choose your own work hours. Assume that you work a five-hour day (including breaks), your job is interesting, and you are paid based on your performance. At what time would you choose to begin?

Responses to the questions are combined to form a composite score that indicates the degree to which the respondent favors morning versus evening. Subsequent researchers have created shorter versions with four, five, or six questions.

== Related research ==
According to a 1997 study of identical and fraternal twins, 54% of variance in morningness–eveningness was due to genetic variability, 3% was due to age, and the rest was explained by non-shared environmental influences and errors in measurement.

A study in 2000 showed that both "morningness" and "eveningness" participants performed poorly in the morning on the Multidimensional Aptitude Battery (MAB) tests. It thus did not support the hypothesis that there is a reliable relationship between morningness–eveningness, time of day, and cognitive ability.

A study in 2008 examined the relationship between morningness and anxiety in adults aged 40–63. It found a negative correlation in women, but not in men, suggesting that gender-related variables may be attributed to morningness and eveningness when looking at mood.

A study in 2009 examined differences between evening and morning types in the timing of melatonin and core body temperature rhythms as well as objective and subjective sleepiness rhythms in a controlled laboratory protocol. The evening types had significantly later timed rhythms for all these variables, particularly that of maximum alertness, which occurred, on average, in the middle of the day for morning types but only four hours before bedtime for evening types.

== See also ==
- Circadian rhythm sleep disorder
- MCTQ
