= Waking up early =

Waking early to accomplish more in the day

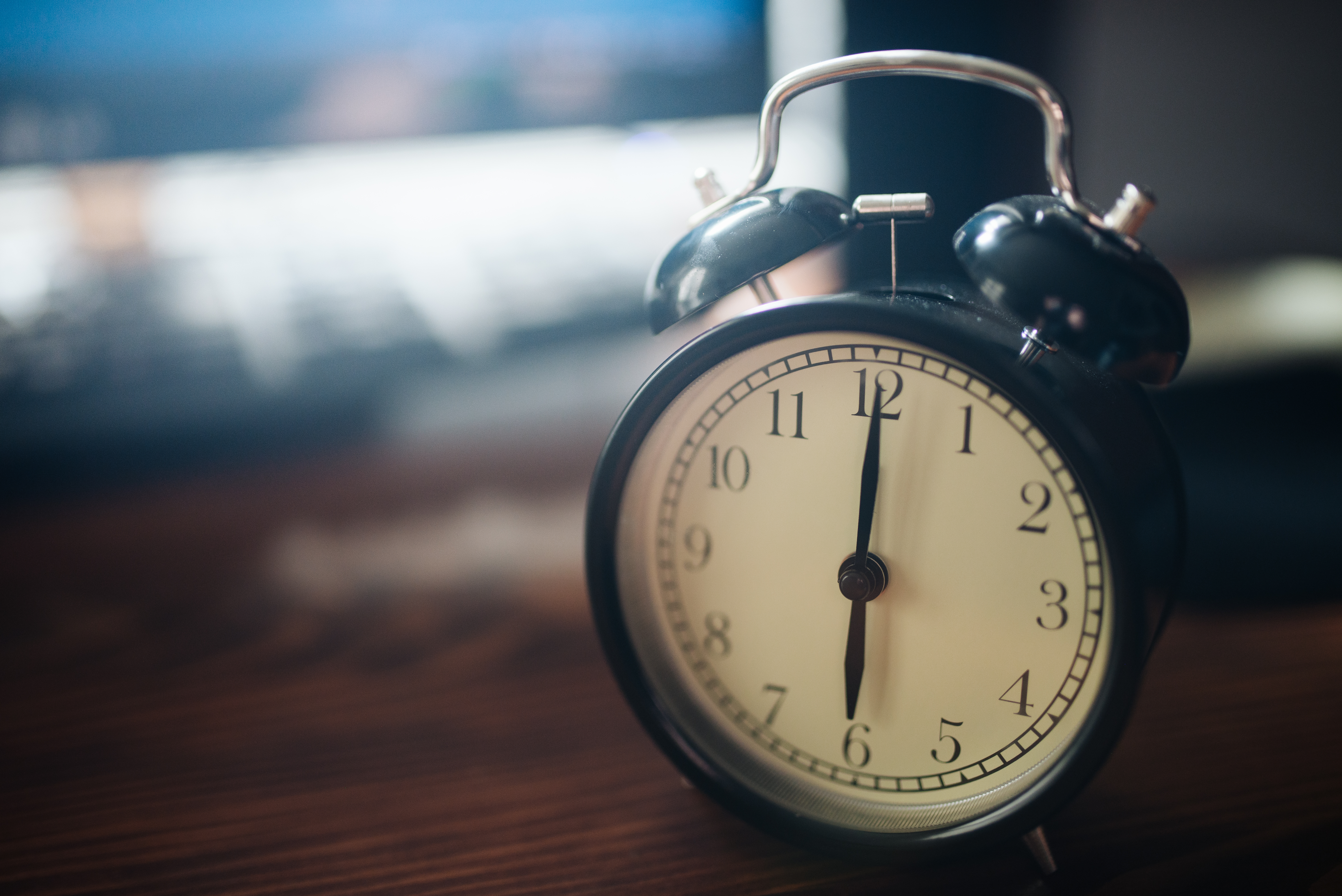
A clock at 6:00am

Waking up early is rising before most others and has also been described as a productivity method — rising early and consistently so as to be able to accomplish more during the day. This method has been recommended since antiquity and is now recommended by a number of personal development gurus.

== Commentary ==
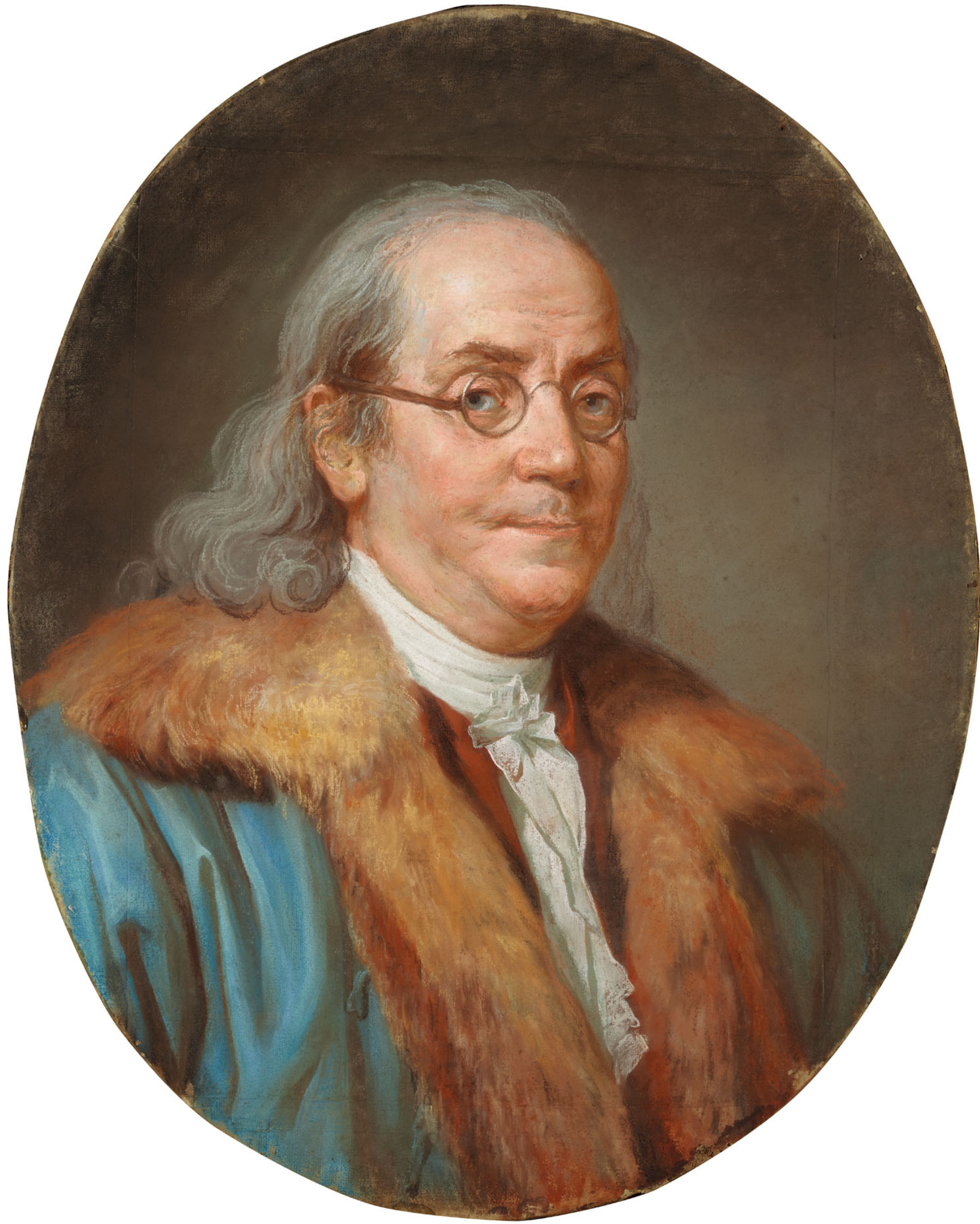
Benjamin Franklin wrote the saying, "Early to bed and early to rise makes a man healthy, wealthy, and wise."

=== In antiquity and the middle ages ===
In the ancient Greek treatise Economics, customarily attributed to Aristotle but commonly considered a work of one of his students, rising early is promoted.

Rising before daylight is also to be commended; it is a healthy habit, and gives more time for the management of the household as well as for liberal studies.

The Chinese proverb, "A year's plan begins in spring, and the day's plan begins in morning", emphasizes that morning is the most important time of day. It has been recorded in proverb anthologies as early as the Liang dynasty.

Anthony Fitzherbert, English judge and scholar of the Middle Ages, also promoted early rising:

Erly rysyng maketh a man hole in body, holer in soule, and rycher in goodes.

=== In modernity ===
Similar ideas were later expressed by Benjamin Franklin who wrote in Poor Richard's Almanack: "Early to bed and early to rise, makes a man healthy, wealthy, and wise". It is a saying that is viewed as a commonsensical proverb, which was included in "A Method of Prayer" by Mathew Henry who also listed it as a phrase "long said", and previously appears in John Clarke's Parœmiologia Anglo-Latina (1639). Franklin is also quoted as saying: "The early morning has gold in its mouth", a translation of the German proverb "Morgenstund hat Gold im Mund".

In 1855, Anna Laetitia Waring published a book entitled "'Early to bed, and early to rise, makes a man healthy, wealthy, and wise', or, Early Rising: A Natural, Social, and Religious Duty" sometimes misattributed to Franklin.

Within the context of religious observances, spiritual writers, most notably Saint Josemaría Escrivá, have called this practice "the heroic minute", referring to the sacrifice which this entails.

"The early bird gets the worm" is a proverb that suggests that getting up early will lead to success during the day. Which brings to mind the immediate counterpoint: "what about the early worm, shouldn't he have stayed in bed?"

James Thurber, in his book Fables for our Time, ended the Fable of the Shrike: "Early to rise and early to bed, makes a Shrike healthy, and wealthy, and dead".

== Criticisms ==
Such recommendations may cast individuals with different natural sleep patterns as lazy or unmotivated when it is a much different matter for a person with a longer or delayed sleep cycle to get up earlier in the morning than for a person with an advanced sleep cycle. In effect, the person accustomed to a later wake time is being asked not to wake up an hour early but 3–4 hours early, while waking up "normally" may already be an unrecognized challenge imposed by the environment.

The bias toward early morning can also adversely affect adolescents in particular. Teenagers tend to require at least 9 full hours of sleep each night, and changes to the endocrine system during puberty shift the natural wake time later in the morning. Enforcing early start times despite this can have negative effects on mood, academic performance, and social skills.

== See also ==
- Lark (person)
- Brahamuhurta
- Blue hour
