= Night owl =

Person who tends to stay awake at night

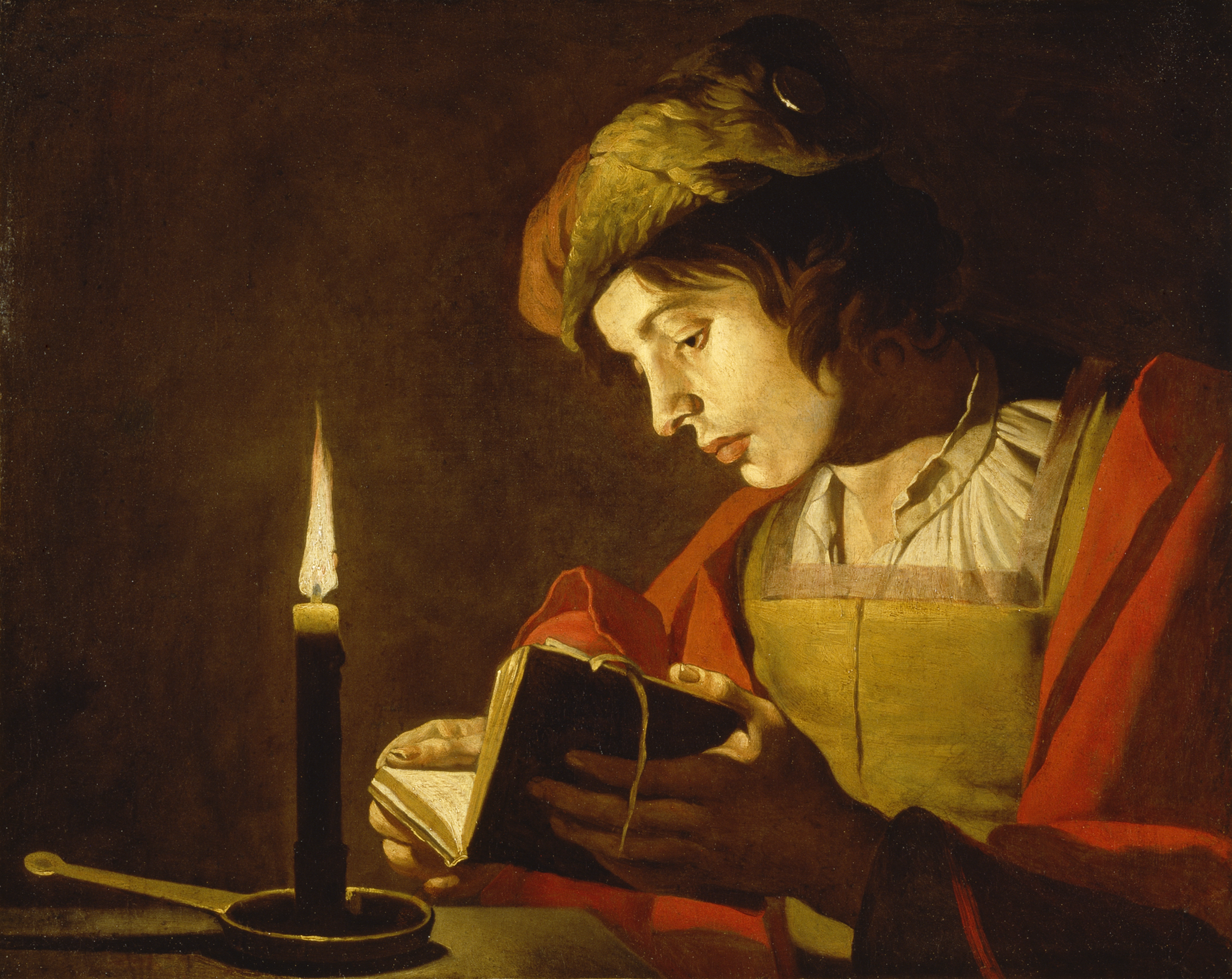
A Young Man Reading by Candlelight, Matthias Stom (c. 1630)

A night owl, evening person, or simply owl, is a person who tends or prefers to be active late at night and into the early morning, and to sleep and wake up later than is considered normal; night owls often work or engage in recreational activities late into the night (in some cases, until around dawn), and sleep until relatively late in the day. People with delayed sleep phase syndrome are often described as night owls.

The opposite of a night owl is an early bird — a lark as opposed to an owl — which is someone who tends to begin sleeping at a time that is considered early and also wakes early. Researchers traditionally use the terms morningness and eveningness for the two chronotypes, or diurnality and nocturnality in animal behavior. In several countries, especially in Scandinavia, one who stays up late is called a B-person, in contrast to an early riser being called an A-person.

== History ==
While staying up after dark was considered a negative trait, this changed in 17th and 18th century Europe (and subsequently spread beyond) due to the development and implementation of artificial lighting: more domestic lights, added street lighting, and adaptation by the royal and upper social classes. The introduction of chocolate, coffee and tea, and cafes that stayed open through dawn, became part of the new culture.

=== Etymology ===
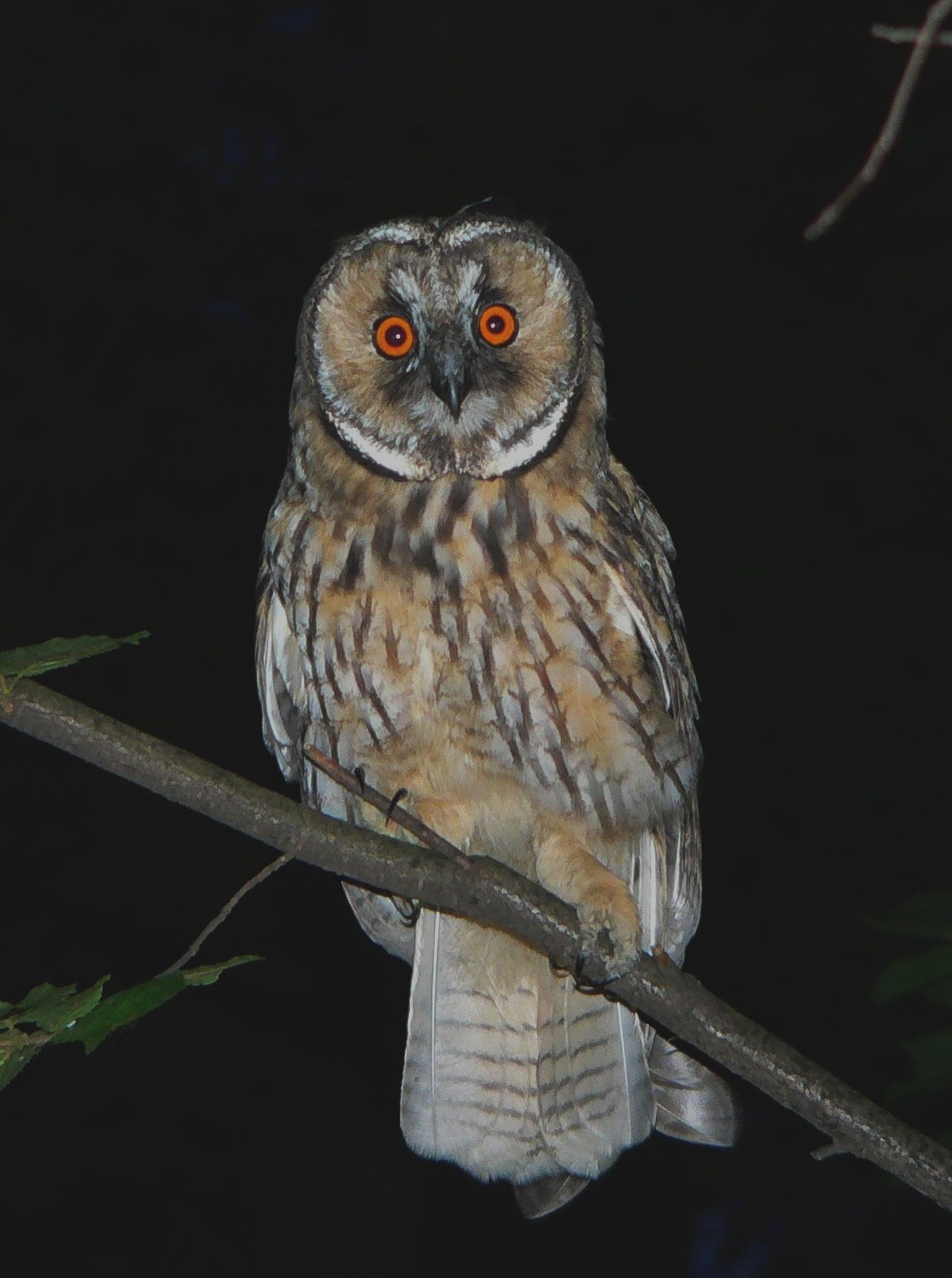
Owls, like this long-eared owl in Poland, are often nocturnal.

The term is derived from nocturnal habits of owls. Most owls sleep during the day and hunt for food at night.

== Characteristics ==
Usually, people who are night owls stay awake past midnight, and extreme night owls may stay awake until just before or even after dawn.

Some night owls have a preference or habit for staying up late, or stay up to work the night shift. Night owls who work the day shift often have difficulties adapting to standard daytime working hours.

Night owls have often been blamed for unpunctuality or attitude problems. Employers, however, have begun to learn to increase productivity by respecting body clocks through flexible working hours, while the Danish "B-Society" of night owls and the American Start School Later movement advocate more school and workplace flexibility for the post-agricultural world.

Some research has found that night owls are more intelligent and creative and more likely to get high-paying jobs than larks, or morning persons. A study among 1,000 adolescents by the University of Madrid found that night owls scored higher than early birds on inductive reasoning tests, which often serve as a proxy for intelligence. However, they lag behind larks in academic performance, and they tend to have unhealthier eating habits, as well as higher rates of smoking. Some research suggests that night owls have a higher risk for bipolar disorder.

Some night owls who have great difficulty adopting desired sleeping and waking times may have delayed sleep phase disorder. Morning light therapy may help to shift sleep rhythms for the night owl.

Several studies have found that night owls may respond differently to some treatments for medical and mental health conditions compared to morning types. For example, a study of adults with depression found that higher eveningness was associated with more side effects and lower efficacy of selective serotonin reuptake inhibitors and selective norepinephrine reuptake inhibitors.

== Psychology ==
The night owl pattern is more prevalent in men than in women. Night owls are more likely to be single than in long-term relationships. A study done in 2013 suggests that they also more commonly possess dark triad traits.

== Factors ==
The tendency to be a night owl exists on a spectrum, with most people being typical, some people having a small or moderate tendency to be a night owl, and a few having an extreme tendency to be a night owl. An individual's own tendency can change over time and is influenced by multiple factors, including:

- a genetic predisposition, which can cause the tendency to run in families,
- the person's age, with teenagers and young adults tending to be night owls more than young children or elderly people, and
- the environment the person lives in, except for the patterns of light they are exposed to through seasonal changes as well as through lifestyle (such as spending the day indoors and using electric lights in the evening).

The genetic make-up of the circadian timing system underpins the difference between early and late chronotypes, or early birds and night owls. While it has been suggested that circadian rhythms may change over time, including dramatic changes that turn a morning lark to a night owl or vice versa, evidence for familial patterns of early or late waking would seem to contradict this, and individual changes are likely on a smaller scale.

== Prevalence ==
A 2007 survey of over 55,000 people found that chronotypes tend to follow a normal distribution, with extreme morning and evening types on the far ends.

== Career options ==
Night owls tend to thrive in careers that do not require working in the early morning. People who want to work in the evening are often employed at restaurants, hotels, entertainment venues, retail stores, and some personal care businesses. Night owls who work the night shift may work in emergency services, in transportation, or at round-the-clock facilities, such as hospitals and some manufacturing plants.

Many businesses that operate in the evening or at night need employees at all levels, from entry-level employees to managers to skilled staff, whenever they are open. For example, most hospitals employ many types of workers around the clock:

- non-medical staff such as security guards, IT specialists, cleaning and maintenance workers, cooks and food service staff, and admissions clerks
- medical staff such as nurses, paramedics, radiographers, pharmacists, and phlebotomists
- managers for each of the main hospital wards or activities, including janitorial supervisors and head nurses.

Industries that tend to be less favorable to night owls include farming, construction, education, and public utilities. Many employees in these industries start work before 7:00 a.m.

== Downsides of night shifts ==
Night owls who opt to work night shifts may not be aware of the health risks associated with doing so. The body follows a circadian rhythm; the body's internal 24-hour clock which responds to natural environmental cues like sunlight and regulates hormone release. One key hormone in this cycle, cortisol, is responsible for maintaining homeostasis in the body. Cortisol levels peak in the early morning activating alertness and dwindle as night approaches to promote rest. Night shifts disrupt this cycle, mismatching the light and dark cycle and the cortisol secretion that is dependent on it.

A few health risks associated with working night shifts include:

- Anxiety
- Depression
- Day-time sleepiness
- Decline in cognitive and physical performance
- Insomnia
- Obstructive sleep apnea
- Metabolic dysregulation
- Cardiovascular diseases

A 2019 study found that night owl participants who shifted their sleep/wake cycle by 2 hours reported improvements in stress, anxiety, depression, and overall cognitive and physical performance.

== Notable people ==
- Samuel Johnson
- E. T. A. Hoffmann
- George Sand
- Charles Darwin
- Gustave Flaubert
- Henri de Toulouse-Lautrec
- Marcel Proust
- Winston Churchill
- Carl Jung
- Joseph Stalin
- Franz Kafka
- Adolf Hitler
- H. P. Lovecraft
- J. R. R. Tolkien
- Mao Zedong
- Frank Meyer
- Charles Bukowski
- Murray Rothbard
- Fidel Castro
- Glenn Gould
- Van Cliburn
- Arturo Toscanini
- Hunter S. Thompson
- Frank Zappa
- Bob Dylan
- John Wayne Gacy
- Bobby Fischer
- Keith Richards
- Fran Lebowitz
- Vladimir Putin
- John Travolta
- Prince
- Tim Smith
- Barack Obama
- Michael Chabon
- Marilyn Manson
- Linus Torvalds
- Kanye West

== In popular culture ==
- In the Lord Byron poem (and Leonard Cohen adaptation) "So, we'll go no more a roving":
  So we'll go no more a roving
  So late into the night
  Though the heart be still as loving
  And the moon be still as bright.
- In Pliny the Elder's Natural History, he states Vita vigila est, "to be alive is to be watchful", a military metaphor for keeping watch in the night.
- For Robert Louis Stevenson, "There is a romance about all those who are abroad in the black hours."
- In Jayne Ann Krentz's Truth or Dare, "Arcadia and Harry were both creatures of the night. They managed to appear oddly stylish at one-thirty in the morning."
- British author Hilary Rubinstein wrote: "Blessed are the owls, for they shall inherit the mystery and magic of the night."
- In the Little River Band song "The Night Owls": "Be strong, find the heart of a night owl falling/Stay up till dawn until the night is gone"

== See also ==
- Chronobiology – the study of sleep cycles and other time-dependent biological systems
- Circadian rhythm sleep disorder
- Insomnia – the inability to fall asleep or stay asleep
- Bedtime procrastination
- Morningness–eveningness questionnaire (MEQ)
- Munich Chronotype Questionnaire (MCTQ)
- Nightlife – activities, mostly entertainment-oriented, done between sundown and sunrise
- Zeitgeber – environmental factors, such as bright light, that reinforce sleep–wake cycles
