= Muhurta =

Time of the day as benefic or malefic

Muhūrta (Sanskrit: मुहूर्त, romanized: muhūrtaṃ) is a Hindu unit of time along with nimiṣa, kāṣṭhā, and kalā in the Hindu calendar.

In the Brāhmaṇas, muhūrta denotes a division of time: 1/30 of a day, or a period of 48 minutes. An alternative meaning of "moment" is also common in the Brāhmanạs. In the Rigveda muhūrta exclusively means, "moment".

Each muhūrta is further divided into 30 kalā, (1 kalā = 1.6 minutes or 96 seconds). Each kalā is further divided into 30 kāṣṭhā (1 kāṣṭhā ≈ 3.2 seconds).

== Etymology ==
Muhurta is a combination of the Sanskrit root words muhu (moment/immediate) and ṛta (order). The Ṛg Ved III.33.5 accordingly mentions this descriptive term. Ṛta refers to the natural, yearly order of the seasons, so muhūrta refers to the daily reflection of these. Also, cf., Śatapatha Brāhmaṇa X.4.2.18, as below.

== Annual calibration ==
The Muhūrtas are traditionally calculated by assuming sunrise at 06:00 am on the vernal equinox, which is the Vedic New Year. Not all of the constellations cross the zenith, so that it is not in every case clear which constellation presides over the Muhūrta. Yet it is clear that one or more prominent features of the correlate constellations, from which the later Muhūrtas draw their respective names, falls within the celestial longitude of the same, drawn from the polar axis.

No.	Daily period	Name (मुहूर्त)	Translation	Correlate constellation/star (Greek)	Quality, or guṇa (गुण)
1	06:00–06:48 (sunrise)	Rudra (रुद्र)	"Cryer", "Howler"	Unknown	Inauspicious
2	06:48–07:36	Āhi (आहि)	"Serpent"	Lacerta	Inauspicious
3	07:36–08:24	Mitra (मित्र)	"Friend"	Unknown	Auspicious
4	08:24–09:12	Pitṝ (पितृ)	"Father"	Cepheus & Casseiopeia	Inauspicious
5	09:12–10:00	Vasu (वसु)	"Bright"	Delphinus	Auspicious
6	10:00–10:48	Vārāha (वाराह)	"Boar"	Unknown	Auspicious
7	10:48–11:36	Viśvedevā (विश्वेदेवा)	"Heavenly Lights in the Universe"	Unknown	Auspicious
8	11:36–12:24	Vidhi (विधि)	"Insight"	Unknown	Auspicious, except Mondays and Fridays
9	12:24–13:12	Sutamukhī (सतमुखी)	"Goat/Charioteer-Face"	Auriga	Auspicious
10	13:12–14:00	Puruhūta (पुरुहूत)	"Many Offerings"	Unknown (Taurus or Orion?)	Inauspicious
11	14:00–14:48	Vāhinī (वाहिनी)	"Possessed of Chariot"	Unknown (Gemini?)	Inauspicious
12	14:48–15:36	Naktanakarā (नक्तनकरा)	"Night Maker"	Unknown	Inauspicious
13	15:36–16:24	Varuṇa (वरुण)	"All-Enveloping Night Sky"	Unknown	Auspicious
14	16:24–17:12	Aryaman (अर्यमन्)	"Possessed of Nobility"	Unknown	Auspicious, except Sundays
15	17:12–18:00	Bhaga (भग)	"Share"/"Stake"	Unknown	Inauspicious
16	18:00–18:48 (sunset)	Girīśa (गिरीश)	"Lord who lifted the Mount (Krishna)"	Unknown	Auspicious
17	18:48–19:36	Ajapāda (अजपाद)	"Unborn Foot"/"Goat Foot"	Unknown	Inauspicious
18	19:36–20:24	Ahir-Budhnya (अहिर्बुध्न्य)	"Serpent at the Bottom"	Hydra	Auspicious
19	20:24–21:12	Puṣya (पुष्य)	"Nourishment"/"Blossom"	Unknown	Auspicious
20	21:12–22:00	Aśvinī (अश्विनी)	"Horsemen"	Unknown	Auspicious
21	22:00–22:48	Yama (यम)	"Restrainer" (Death)	Boötes (cf., Bhūteśa)	Inauspicious
22	22:48–23:36	Agni (अग्नि)	"Fire"/"Ignition"	Ara	Auspicious
23	23:36–00:24	Vidhātṛ (विधातृ)	"Distributor"	Unknown	Auspicious
24	00:24–01:12	Kaṇḍa (क्ण्ड)	"Ornament"	Corona Borealis	Auspicious
25	01:12–02:00	Aditi (अदिति)	"Limitless"/"Boundless"	goddess good time	Auspicious
26	02:00–02:48	Jīva/Amṛta (जीव/अमृत)	"Life"/"Immortal"	Unknown	Very Auspicious
27	02:48–03:36	Viṣṇu (विष्णु)	"All Pervading"	Hercules	Auspicious
28	03:36–04:24	Dyumadgadyuti (द्युमद्गद्युति)	"Resounding Light"	Lyra	Auspicious
29	04:24–05:12	Brahma (ब्रह्म)	"Universe"	Cygnus	Very Auspicious
30	05:12–06:00	Samudra (समुद्र)	"Ocean"	Deluge (region with several aqueous constellations)	Auspicious

== Literature ==
The term appears as early as the Ṛg Veda, where, according to Monier Williams, it means "a moment", but does not evidence any specification of an exact periodicity there as received in later works, such as the Śatapatha-Brāhmaṇa, "The One Hundred Path Riddle" or the Taittirīya-Brāhmaṇa, "The Partridge's Riddle".

Pt. Vijay Shrikrishna Jakatdar points to two specific Ṛg Veda passages that employ the term, III.33.5, and III.53.8:

रमध्वं मे वचसे सोम्याय रतावरीरुप मुहूर्तमेवैः
पर सिन्धुमछा बर्हती मनीषावस्युरह्वे कुशिकस्य सूनुः

Translation:

Linger a little at my friendly bidding rest, Holy Ones, a moment in your journey.
With hymn sublime soliciting your favour Kuśika's son hath called unto the River.

and

रूपं-रूपं मघवा बोभवीति मायाः कर्ण्वानस्तन्वं परि सवाम
तरिर्यद दिवः परि मुहूर्तमागात सवैर्मन्त्रैरन्र्तुपा रतावा

Translation:

Maghavan weareth every shape at pleasure, effecting magic changes in his body,
Holy One, drinker out of season, coming thrice, in a moment, through fit prayers, from heaven.

Taittirīya-Brāhmaṇa mentions the names of 15 muhūrtas as follows:

1. saṁjñānaṁ
2. vijñānaṁ
3. prajñānaṁ
4. jānad
5. abhijānat
6. saṁkalpamānaṁ
7. prakalpamānam
8. upakalpamānam
9. upakḷptaṁ
10. kḷptam
11. śreyo
12. vasīya
13. āyat
14. saṁbhūtaṁ
15. bhūtam |

Śatapatha Brāhmaṇa describes a muhūrta as 1/15th portion of a day:

átʰa yaccáturviṃśatimātmáno'kuruta
tásmāc-cátur-viṃśaty-ardʰa-māsaḥ saṃ-vatsaraḥ sá etaiś-cátur-viṃśatyā triṃ-śád-iṣṭakair-ātmábʰir-na vyábʰavat-sa páñca-daśā́hno rūpā́ṇy-apaśyad-ātmánas-tanvò muhūrtā́lokam-pr̥ṇāḥ páñca-daśaiva rā́tres-tadyán-muhu trā́yante tásmān-muhurtā átʰa yát-kṣudrāḥ sánta imā́ṃ-lokā́n-āpūráyanti tásmāl-lokam-pr̥ṇā́ḥ (X.4.2.18)

saṃvatsarásya muhūrtā́ yā́vanto muhūrtā́s tā́vanti páñcadaśa kŕ̥̄tvaḥ kṣiprā́ṇi yā́vanti kṣiprā́ṇi tā́vanti páñcadaśa kŕ̥̄tva etárhīṇi yā́vanty etárhīṇi tā́vanti páñcadaśa kŕ̥̄tva idā́nīni yā́vantīdā́nīni tā́vantaḥ páñcadaśa kŕ̥̄tvaḥ prā́ṇā́ yā́vantaḥ prā́ṇā́s tā́vanto 'nā́ yā́vanto 'nā́s tā́vanto nimeṣā́ yā́vanto nimeṣā́s tā́vanto lomagartā́ yā́vanto lomagartā́s tā́vanti svedā́yanā́ni yā́vanti svedā́yanā́ni tā́vanta eté stokā́ varṣanti (XII.3.2.5b)

It is stated in Manusmṛti that 18 nimeṣas ("twinklings of the eye") are 1 kāṣṭhā, 30 kāṣṭhās are 1 kāla, 30 kālas are one muhūrta, and 30 muhūrtas are one day and night.

== Significance (version 1) ==
It is a common practice in Hinduism to perform or avoid activities like important religious ceremonies on the basis of the quality of a particular Muhūrta. One or more Muhūrtas are recommended by the Vedic scriptures when performing rituals and other ceremonies. This is demonstrated in the way "Muhūrt" is used in present-day Indian subcontinent for calculating the most auspicious moment for a Vedic-Hindu Wedding ceremony. Astrologers are often hired to calculate a moment for the wedding so that any possible divinely-sourced problems can be averted. Jakatdar suggests a shift in the contemporary temperament regarding the traditional approach to calculating such events, to accommodate the ever increasing complexity of modern life. The muhūrt has the same utility in the marriage rites in Hinduism.

Another example is the so-called Brahma Muhūrta, which is about one and a half hours before sunrise. This particular time, which is associated with the constellations during the Vernal Equinox, is said to be auspicious for practicing yoga. There is also the case of samayik, which is part of the initiation rite for the Svetambar mendicants or those who pursue a perpetual state of heightened meditative awareness. They take the samayik, a vow for life taken for short periods, preferably one or two muhūrts, where one muhūrt constitutes forty minutes.

== Significance (version 2) ==
Traditionally, it is common practice amongst Hindus to start or avoid starting significant tasks like religious ceremonies, etc. on the basis of the quality of a particular Muhūrta. The Vedic scriptures also generally recommend one or more Muhūrtas to perform rituals and practices. The most widely known example of this practice:

Brahma Muhūrta, approximately one and a half hours before sunrise or more precisely is 1Hr 36 Mins. i.e. 96 Minutes = 2 Muhūrta or 4 Ghaṭīkā, is recommended in all practices of yoga is traditionally considered most apt for meditation. However, it is clear from the associations of the names with specific constellations that the present Brahma-Muhūrta starts just before 6:00 am during the Vernal Equinox. At present, Jīva-Amṛta and Viṣṇu comprise the two twilight muhūrtas prior to sunrise.

== See also ==
- Electional astrology
- Gudhi Padwa
- Jyotiṣa
- Rāhu-Kālam or Rāhu Kāla
