= Till Roenneberg =

German biologist (born 1953)

- Born: 4 May 1953 (age 73); Munich, Germany
- Education: LMU Munich
- Known for: MCTQ, Chronotype, Social Jet Lag, Aschoff Ruler
- Scientific career
- Fields: Chronobiology
- Workplaces: Max Planck Institute for Behavioral Physiology, LMU Munich, University College London, Harvard University

Till Roenneberg (born 4 May 1953) is a professor of chronobiology at the Institute of Medical Psychology at LMU Munich, Germany. Roenneberg, in collaboration with Martha Merrow, explores the impact of light on human circadian rhythms, focusing on aspects such as chronotypes and social jet lag in relation to health benefits.

== Life ==
Roenneberg was born in Munich, Germany. He began working with Jürgen Aschoff at the age of 17.

Roenneberg attended both the University College London and LMU Munich where he began by studying physics. He switched to medicine in order to focus on the science of the human body, but ended up studying biology. As a postdoctoral fellow, he studied again under Jürgen Aschoff, studying annual rhythms in the body, then moved to the United States to study the cellular basis of biological clocks under Woody Hastings at Harvard University.

In 1991, he began the tradition of giving the Aschoff's Ruler prize to a chronobiologist who has advanced the field.

He is currently the vice-chair of the Institute for Medical Psychology of LMU Munich, the head of the Centre for Chronobiology, the president-elect of the European Biological Rhythms Society, the president of the World Federation of Societies for Chronobiology, and a member of the Senior Common Room of Brasenose College, University of Oxford. From 2005 to 2010 he was the coordinator of "EUCLOCK" and coordinator of the Daimler-Benz-Foundation network "ClockWORK", and from 2010 to 2012 was the member at large of the Society for Research of Biological Rhythms

== Work ==
=== Early work ===
==== Dinoflagellates ====
Aside from human chronobiology, Roenneberg has significantly contributed to other aspects of the chronobiology field. He has done extensive work on dinoflagellates, a unicellular organism, and has been able to show that even this simple organism is capable of possessing two independent rhythms, providing evidence that a single cell can have two different oscillators. In addition, his work on dinoflagellates has been able to show that these two independent oscillators differ to a significant extent in that they respond differently when treated with various light pulses. They found that the two oscillators have varying sensitivities to different types of light. The B-oscillator is most sensitive to blue light while the A oscillator is sensitive to both blue and red light.

==== Neurospora crassa ====
Roenneberg has also completed work on Neurospora crassa, determining the masking qualities of entrainment through a Frequency (gene)-null circadian oscillator. He observed in the period of spore production (conidia bands) the phenomenon of masking, an unexpected effect on circadian entrainment due to a particular zeitgeber (such as light or temperature). Masking has significant implications not only for future studies – which must attempt to demask affected data – but also in relation to entrainment in everyday life.

=== Current work ===
==== Chronotype questionnaire ====
One of Till Roenneberg's most renowned accomplishments is the development of the Munich Chronotype Questionnaire (MCTQ). As a collaboration with Martha Merrow at LMU Munich, the MCTQ samples sleep and circadian rhythm data from more than 25,000 participants. Unlike other chronotyping methods, which address the psychology of sleep, the MCTQ measures the phase angle of entrainment, the difference between an organism's intrinsic circadian period and the environmental light cycle. Thus, this questionnaire is the first to use a biological foundation, rather than psychology to determine the basis of sleep schedules.

Questions about work day and free day sleep schedules, work details, and lifestyle provide data to aid in the understanding of the interplay of biological clocks and social influences. Such research has led Roenneberg to his theory of social jet lag. The MCTQ categorizes each participant into one of seven chronotype groups and utilizes data on participants' midsleep phase and sleep debt to survey what "type" of sleeper each person is, such as late sleepers, slightly late sleepers, early sleepers, and others. From these data, the MCTQ offers methods to make up for sleep debt (if any), and offers suggestions on what to do to wake up earlier or sleep later.

This chronotype questionnaire is important because it delves into the social aspects of circadian rhythms. By testing behavior rather than directly testing genetic factors, the MCTQ may offer new information regarding how the effects of external factors, including geographic location, seasons, obesity, social jet lag, or shift work, may relate to genetic predispositions of circadian rhythms.

==== Internal time ====
Roenneberg released a book in March 2012 titled Internal Time: Chronotypes, Social Jet Lag, and Why You're So Tired where he explains the concepts behind circadian rhythm to the masses. One of the major points in his book is, "Early birds and night owls are born, not made." Roenneberg wanted to rid people of labels such as "lazy" that frequently get placed upon those who wake up late. With this book, he wanted to deliver his point that these sleep patterns are due to people's genetics and are not from choice. He discusses how everyone is born with an internal clock, and living a lifestyle in dissonance with this inherent biological clock puts individuals at greater risk for health problems. Roenneberg introduces the term "social jet lag," saying it is more dangerous than normal jet lag because social jet lag forces individuals to persistently go against their biological clock in a consistent light/dark cycle. In this book, he defines social jet lag as “the difference between midsleep on free days and midsleep on work days." Free days are defined as days without an alarm clock, where one naturally wakes up, and work days when one wakes up with an alarm clock. Midsleep is defined as the midpoint of an individual's sleeping period. One of the significant health risks of social jet lag is obesity, and Roenneberg claims that for every hour of social jet lag, the probability of being overweight increases by approximately 33%. In fact, social jet lag is so prevalent that Roenneberg claims that 87% of the population of Central Europe suffers from social jet lag to some degree.

Roenneberg also claims that adolescents, biologically, have an internal clock that causes their midsleep to fall later than young infants and adults. Thus, teenagers are not lazy, but are simply following their internal rhythms by going to sleep later and waking up later. This late midsleep pattern changes after adolescence, but at different points for men and women. Women's midsleep changes around age eighteen, while men's midsleep changes at the age of twenty-one. Forcing teenagers to wake up early, against their internal rhythms, leads to stress. As many studies have shown, stress leads to unhealthy decisions such as smoking and drinking.

== Awards ==
- Harvard-Hoops Price for Excellence in Teaching
- Honma Prize for Outstanding Contributions to Chronobiological Research
- Silver Medal of LMU Munich
- Professional Lighting Design Recognition Award for Research and Education
- The Daylight Award 2024 for Daylight Research

== Selected publications ==
Some of Roenneberg's publications include:

- Roenneberg, Till; Allebrandt, Karla V.; Merrow, Martha; Vetter, Céline (2012). "Social Jetlag and Obesity". Current Biology. 22 (10): 939–43. Bibcode:2012CBio...22..939R. doi:10.1016/j.cub.2012.03.038. hdl:11370/fab2c698-0e17-4a00-96a9-2a254e13ef5e. PMID 22578422.
- Levandovski, Rosa; Dantas, Giovana; Fernandes, Luciana Carvalho; Caumo, Wolnei; Torres, Iraci; Roenneberg, Till; Hidalgo, Maria Paz Loayza; Allebrandt, Karla Viviani (2011). "Depression Scores Associate with Chronotype and Social Jetlag in a Rural Population". Chronobiology International. 28 (9): 771–8. doi:10.3109/07420528.2011.602445. PMID 21895489. S2CID 31925222.
- Allebrandt, Karla V.; Teder-Laving, Maris; Akyol, Mahmut; Pichler, Irene; Müller-Myhsok, Bertram; Pramstaller, Peter; Merrow, Martha; Meitinger, Thomas; et al. (2010). "CLOCK Gene Variants Associate with Sleep Duration in Two Independent Populations" (PDF). Biological Psychiatry. 67 (11): 1040–7. doi:10.1016/j.biopsych.2009.12.026. PMID 20149345. S2CID 12153231.
- Kantermann, Thomas; Roenneberg, Till (2009). "Is Light-At-Night a Health Risk Factor or a Health Risk Predictor?". Chronobiology International. 26 (6): 1069–74. doi:10.3109/07420520903223984. PMID 19731106. S2CID 45903493.
- Allebrandt, K.V.; Roenneberg, T. (2008). "The search for circadian clock components in humans: New perspectives for association studies". Brazilian Journal of Medical and Biological Research. 41 (8): 716–721. doi:10.1590/S0100-879X2008000800013. PMID 18797707.
- Kantermann, Thomas; Juda, Myriam; Merrow, Martha; Roenneberg, Till (2007). "The Human Circadian Clock's Seasonal Adjustment is Disrupted by Daylight Saving Time" (PDF). Current Biology. 17 (22): 1996–2000. Bibcode:2007CBio...17.1996K. doi:10.1016/j.cub.2007.10.025. PMID 17964164. S2CID 3135927.
- Merrow, M.; Roenneberg, T. (2007). "Circadian Entrainment ofNeurospora crassa". Cold Spring Harbor Symposia on Quantitative Biology. 72: 279–85. doi:10.1101/sqb.2007.72.032. PMID 18419284.
- Roenneberg, Till; Kuehnle, Tim; Juda, Myriam; Kantermann, Thomas; Allebrandt, Karla; Gordijn, Marijke; Merrow, Martha (2007). "Epidemiology of the human circadian clock" (PDF). Sleep Medicine Reviews. 11 (6): 429–38. doi:10.1016/j.smrv.2007.07.005. hdl:11370/65d6f03a-88cd-405c-a067-4afbc1b9ba9d. PMID 17936039. S2CID 11628329.
- Tan, Ying; Dragovic, Zdravko; Roenneberg, Till; Merrow, Martha (2004). "Entrainment Dissociates Transcription and Translation of a Circadian Clock Gene in Neurospora" (PDF). Current Biology. 14 (5): 433–8. Bibcode:2004CBio...14..433T. doi:10.1016/j.cub.2004.02.035. PMID 15028220. S2CID 15853792.
- Roenneberg, Till; Merrow, Martha (2003). "The Network of Time: Understanding the Molecular Circadian System" (PDF). Current Biology. 13 (5): R198–207. Bibcode:2003CBio...13.R198R. doi:10.1016/S0960-9822(03)00124-6. PMID 12620213. S2CID 17636890.
- Morse, D.; Hastings, J. W.; Roenneberg, T. (1994). "Different Phase Responses of the Two Circadian Oscillators in Gonyaulax". Journal of Biological Rhythms. 9 (3–4): 263–74. doi:10.1177/074873049400900307. PMID 7772794. S2CID 25821678.
