= Chronotype =

Person's daily sleep preferences

A chronotype is the behavioral manifestation of an underlying circadian rhythm's myriad physical processes. A person's chronotype is the propensity for the individual to sleep at a particular time during a 24-hour period. Eveningness (delayed sleep period; most active and alert in the evening) and morningness (advanced sleep period; most active and alert in the morning) are the two extremes with most individuals having some flexibility in the timing of their sleep period. However, across development there are changes in the propensity of the sleep period with pre-pubescent children preferring an advanced sleep period, adolescents preferring a delayed sleep period and many elderly preferring an advanced sleep period.

Chronotypes have also been investigated in other species, such as fruit flies and mice.

== History ==
Physiology professor Nathaniel Kleitman's 1939 book Sleep and Wakefulness, revised 1963, summarized the existing knowledge of sleep and proposed the existence of a basic rest-activity cycle. Kleitman, with his students including William C. Dement and Eugene Aserinsky, continued his research throughout the 1900s. O. Öquist's 1970 thesis at the Department of Psychology, University of Göteborg, Sweden, marks the beginning of modern research into chronotypes, and is entitled Kartläggning av individuella dygnsrytmer, or "Charting Individual Circadian Rhythms".

The causes and regulation of chronotypes, including developmental change, individual propensity for a specific chronotype, and flexible versus fixed chronotypes have yet to be determined. However, research is beginning to shed light on these questions, such as the relationship between age and chronotype. There are candidate genes (called CLOCK genes) that exist in most cells in the body and brain, referred to as the circadian system that regulates physiological phenomena (hormone levels, metabolic function, body temperature, cognitive faculties, and sleeping). With the exception of the most extreme and rigid chronotypes, regulation is likely due to gene-environment interactions. Important environmental cues (zeitgebers) include light, feeding, social behavior, and work and school schedules. Additional research has proposed an evolutionary link between chronotype and nighttime vigilance in ancestral societies.

In 2016, clinical psychologist Michael J. Breus proposed four main chronotype categories: lions, bears, wolves, and dolphins. These categories correspond respectively to larks, middle-of-the-road people, night owls, and people with irregular sleep schedules.

== Measurement ==
Normal variation in chronotype encompasses sleep–wake cycles that are two to three hours later in evening types than morning types. Extremes outside of this range can cause a person difficulty in participating in normal work, school, and social activities. If a person's "lark" or (more commonly) "owl" tendencies are strong and intractable to the point of disallowing normal participation in society, the person is normally considered to have a circadian rhythm sleep disorder.

=== Morningness–eveningness questionnaire ===
Olov Östberg modified Öquist's questionnaire and in 1976, together with J.A. (Jim) Horne, he published the 19-item morningness–eveningness questionnaire, MEQ, which is still used and referred to in virtually all research on this topic.

Researchers in many countries have worked on validating the MEQ with regard to their local cultures. A revision of the scoring of the MEQ as well as a component analysis was done by Jacques Taillard et al. in 2004, working in France with employed people over the age of 50. Previously the MEQ had been validated only for subjects of university age.

=== Circadian Type Inventory ===
The Circadian Type Inventory, developed by Folkard (1987), is an improved version of the 20-item Circadian Type Questionnaire (CTQ).

The CTI was initially developed to identify individuals capable of adapting to shift work. Thus, the scale assesses two factors that influence a person's ability to alter his or her sleeping rhythms: rigidity/flexibility of sleeping habits and ability/inability to overcome drowsiness. Since its creation, the scale has undergone a number of revisions to improve its psychometric properties. An 18-item version was used as part of the larger Standard Shiftwork Index (SSI) in a study conducted by Barton and colleagues. This shorter scale was then reduced and altered to make an 11 item scale by De Milia et al.

=== Composite Scale of Morningness ===
Smith et al. (1989) analyzed items from MEQ, Diurnal Type Scale (DTS), and CTQ and chose the best ones to develop an improved instrument, the 13-item Composite Scale of Morningness (CSM or CS). CSM consists of 9 items from the MEQ and 4 items from the Diurnal Type Scale and is regarded as an improved version of MEQ. It currently exists in 14 language versions; the most recently developed are Polish, Russian and Hindi.

=== Others ===
Roberts, in 1999, designed the Lark-Owl Chronotype Indicator, LOCI. Till Roenneberg's Munich Chronotype Questionnaire (MCTQ) from 2003 uses a quantitative approach; his many thousands of subjects have answered questions about their sleep behavior.

== Characteristics ==
Most people are neither evening nor morning types but lie somewhere in between. Estimates vary, but a 2007 survey of over 55,000 people by Roenneberg et al. showed that morningness–eveningness tends to follow a normal distribution. People who share a chronotype, morningness or eveningness, have similar activity-pattern timing: sleep, appetite, exercise, study etc. Researchers in the field of chronobiology look for objective markers by which to measure the chronotype spectrum. Paine et al. conclude that "morningness/eveningness preference is largely independent of ethnicity, gender, and socioeconomic position, indicating that it is a stable characteristic that may be better explained by endogenous factors".

=== Sleep ===
Horne and Östberg found that morning types had a higher daytime temperature with an earlier peak time than evening types and that they went to sleep and awoke earlier, but no differences in sleep lengths were found. They also note that age should be considered in assessments of morningness and eveningness, noting how a "bed time of 23:30 may be indicative of a morning type within a student population, but might be more related to an evening type in the 40–60 years age group". Clodoré et al. found differences in alertness between morning and evening types after a two-hour sleep reduction. Duffy et al. investigated "changes in the phase relationship between endogenous circadian rhythms and the sleep-wake cycle", and found that although evening types woke at a later clock hour than morning types, morning types woke at a later circadian phase. Zavada et al. show that the exact hour of mid-sleep on free (non-work) days may be the best marker for sleep-based assessments of chronotype; it correlates well with such physiological markers as dim-light melatonin onset (DLMO) and the minimum of the daily cortisol rhythm. They also state that each chronotype category "contains a similar portion of short and long sleepers". Chung et al. studied sleep quality in shift-working nurses and found that "the strongest predictor of sleep quality was morningness–eveningness, not the shift schedule or shift pattern", as "evening types working on changing shifts had higher risk of poor sleep quality compared to morning types".

=== Diurnal rhythms ===
Gibertini et al. (1999) assessed blood levels of the hormone melatonin, finding that the melatonin acrophase (the time at which the peak of a rhythm occurs) was strongly related to circadian type, whereas amplitude was not. They note that morning types evidence a more rapid decline in melatonin levels after the peak than do evening types. Baehr et al. found that, in young adults, the daily body temperature minimum occurred at about 4 a.m. for morning types but at about 6 a.m. for evening types. This minimum occurred at approximately the middle of the eight-hour sleep period for morning types, but closer to waking in evening types. Evening types had a lower nocturnal temperature. The temperature minimum occurred about a half-hour earlier in women than in men. Similar results were found by Mongrain et al. in Canada, 2004. Morning types had lower pain sensitivity throughout a day than evening types, but the two chronotype groups did not differ in the shape of diurnal variations in pain. There are some differences between chronotypes in sexual activity, with evening chronotypes preferring later hours for sex as compared to other chronotypes.

=== Personality ===
Chronotypes differ in many aspects of personality, such as grit, but also in intellectual domains, like creative thinking. Experimental studies on discomfort glare perception and chronotype have shown that early chronotypes can tolerate more discomfort glare in the morning compared to late chronotypes.

=== Intelligence ===
A meta-analysis found a small positive association between an evening chronotype and intelligence; similar results were subsequently found in a large sample using a standardized battery.

=== Genetic variants associated with chronotype ===
Studies show (Note: For example, see Kalmbach, et al. for discussion of three landmark genome-wide association studies) that there are 22 genetic variants associated with chronotype. These variants occur near genes known to be important in photoreception and circadian rhythms. The variant most strongly associated with chronotype occurs near RGS16, which is a regulator of G-protein signalling and has a known role in circadian rhythms. In mice, gene ablation of Rgs16 lengthens the circadian period of behavioural rhythm. By temporally regulating cAMP signalling, Rgs16 has been shown to be a key factor in synchronising intercellular communication between pacemaker neurons in the suprachiasmatic nucleus (SCN), the centre for circadian rhythm control in humans.

PER2 is a well-known regulator of circadian rhythms and contains a variant recently shown to be associated with iris formation. This suggests a link between iris function and chronotype. Per2 knockout mice show arrhythmic locomotor activity. The gene ASB1, associated with eveningness and a tendency to day-napping is a result of interbreeding between archaic and modern humans and is originally a Neanderthal trait, possibly linked to a more crepuscular lifestyle in this species.

Therefore, chronotypes are genetically heritable.

=== Chronotype and disease ===
Disrupted circadian rhythms are associated with several human diseases. For example, chronotype is genetically correlated with BMI (body mass index).

A 2016 study did not find causal effects in either direction. A later (genetic) Mendelian randomization study did find that if an 11-years-old child goes to bed 2 hours later, their waist-to-height ratio causally increases 0.6 cm more in 2.5 years. A causal effect in the opposite direction was not found: genes that predict higher adiposity were not correlated with delayed bedtimes.

Evening chronotype has been reported to be a risk factor for bipolar disorder and depression.

Evening chronotypes are genetically linked to ADHD, according to genetic polymorphism studies that have linked genes involved in ADHD to genes involved in circadian rhythm. A high proportion of people with ADHD have delayed sleep phase disorder.

Chronotype is also associated with differential response to some treatments. For example, higher evening chronotype is associated with more side effects and lower efficacy of some selective serotonin reuptake inhibitors and serotonin norepinephrine reuptake inhibitors in adults with depression.
