= Munich Chronotype Questionnaire =

Circadian rhythm questionnaire

The Munich Chronotype Questionnaire (MCTQ) was created in 2002 by Till Roenneberg and Martha Merrow at LMU Munich. The MCTQ samples sleep and circadian rhythm data from more than 25,000 participants.

Questions about work day and free day sleep schedules, work details, and lifestyle provide data to aid in the understanding of how biological clocks work in social life, such as Roenneberg's conclusions of social jetlag. The MCTQ categorizes each participant into one of seven chronotype groups, and utilizes data on participants’ midsleep phase and sleep debt to survey what "type" of sleeper each person is. From these data, the MCTQ offers methods to make up for sleep debt (if any), and offers suggestions on what to do to wake up earlier or sleep later.

This Chronotype Questionnaire is important because it delves into the social aspects of circadian rhythms. By testing behavior rather than directly testing genetic factors, the MCTQ may offer new information regarding how the influences of external factors (like geographic location or seasons) or things such as obesity or social jetlag, may relate to genetic predispositions of circadian rhythms.
